This is a complete list of all 1468 Statutory Instruments published in the United Kingdom in the year 1987.


Statutory Instruments

1–100
Parish and Community Meetings (Polls) Rules 1987 SI 1987/1
National Health Service (Food Premises) (Scotland) Regulations 1987 SI 1987/2
Public Telecommunication System Designation (Swindon Cable Limited) Order 1987 SI 1987/3
Offshore Installations (Safety Zones) (Amendment) Order 1987 SI 1987/4
National Health Service (General Medical and Pharmaceutical Services) Amendment Regulations 1987 SI 1987/5
Health Education Authority (Establishment and Constitution) Order 1987 SI 1987/6
Health Education Authority Regulations 1987 SI 1987/7
Price Marking (Petrol) (Amendment) Order 1987 SI 1987/8
Housing Revenue Account Rate Fund Contribution Limits (Scotland) Order 1987 SI 1987/11
Act of Sederunt (Rules of Court Amendment No. 1) (Drug Trafficking) 1987 SI 1987/12
A13 Trunk Road (Ripple Road, Barking and Dagenham) (Prohibition of Use of Gaps in Central Reservation) Order 1987 SI 1987/13
Local Government Reorganisation (Property) (West Yorkshire) Order 1987 SI 1987/15
Pelican Pedestrian Crossings Regulations and General Directions 1987 SI 1987/16
Supplementary Benefit (Housing Requirements and Resources) Amendment Regulations 1987 SI 1987/17
National Health Service (Food Premises) Regulations 1987 SI 1987/18
Potatoes (Prohibition on Landing) (Great Britain) Order 1987 SI 1987/19
European Assembly Elections (Day of By-election) (Midlands West Constituency) Order 1987 SI 1987/20
Condensed Milk and Dried Milk (Scotland) Amendment Regulations 1987 SI 1987/26
Community Drivers' Hours (Passenger and Goods Vehicles) (Temporary Exception) Regulations 1987 SI 1987/27
Drivers' Hours (Passenger and Goods Vehicles) (Exemption) Regulations 1987 SI 1987/28
Industrial Training Levy (Construction Board) Order 1987 SI 1987/29
Northern Ireland (Emergency Provisions) Act 1978 (Continuance) Order 1987 SI 1987/30
Social Security (Hospital In-Patients) Amendment Regulations 1987 SI 1987/31
Family Income Supplements (Computation) Regulations 1987 SI 1987/32
Statutory Sick Pay (Rate of Payment) Regulations 1987 SI 1987/33
Education (Publication of proposals to change status of a controlled school) Regulations 1987 SI 1987/34
Supplementary Benefit (Single Payments) Amendment Regulations 1987 SI 1987/36
Dangerous Substances in Harbour Areas Regulations 1987 SI 1987/37
Court of Session etc. Fees Amendment Order 1987 SI 1987/38
Sheriff Court Fees Amendment Order 1987 SI 1987/39
Act of Sederunt (Sessions of Court and Sederunt Days) 1987 SI 1987/40
Social Security Benefits Up-rating Order 1987 SI 1987/45
Social Security (Contributions, Re-rating) Order 1987 SI 1987/46
Social Security (Treasury Supplement to and Allocation of Contributions) (Re-rating) Order 1987 SI 1987/48
Supplementary Benefit Uprating Regulations 1987 SI 1987/49
Registration of Births, Deaths and Marriages (Fees) Order 1987 SI 1987/50
Weights and Measures (Local and Working Standard Capacity Measures and Testing Equipment) Regulations 1987 SI 1987/51
Health and Safety (Explosives and Petroleum Fees) (Modification) Regulations 1987 SI 1987/52
Offshore Installations (Safety Zones) (Revocation) Order 1987 SI 1987/53
Offshore Installations (Safety Zones) Order 1987 SI 1987/54
Offshore Installations (Safety Zones) (No. 2) Order 1987 SI 1987/55
Offshore Installations (Safety Zones) (No. 3) Order 1987 SI 1987/56
Offshore Installations (Safety Zones) (No. 4) Order 1987 SI 1987/57
Offshore Installations (Safety Zones) (No. 5) Order 1987 SI 1987/58
Offshore Installations (Safety Zones) (No. 6) Order 1987 SI 1987/59
Offshore Installations (Safety Zones) (No. 7) Order 1987 SI 1987/61
Offshore Installations (Safety Zones) (No. 8) October 1987 SI 1987/62
Merchant Shipping (Fees) Regulations 1987 SI 1987/63
Banking Act 1979 (Advertisements)(Amendment) Regulations 1987 SI 1987/64
Banking Act 1979 (Exempt Transactions) (Amendment) Regulations 1987 SI 1987/65
Offshore Installations (Safety Zones) (No. 9) Order 1987 SI 1987/66
Offshore Installations (Safety Zones) (No. 10) Order 1987 SI 1987/67
Offshore Installations (Safety Zones) (No. 11) Order 1987 SI 1987/68
Offshore Installations (Safety Zones) (No. 12) Order 1987 SI 1987/69
Offshore Installations (Safety Zones) (No. 13) Order 1987 SI 1987/70
Offshore Installations (Safety Zones) (No. 14) Order 1987 SI 1987/71
Offshore Installations (Safety Zones) (No. 15) Order 1987 SI 1987/72
Gipsy Encampments (Designation of the Borough of Maidstone) Order 1987 SI 1987/73
Diseases of Animals (Approved Disinfectants)(Amendment) Order 1987 SI 1987/74
Derwent Valley Railway (Transfer) Light Railway Order 1987 SI 1987/75
Statutory Maternity Pay (Compensation of Employers) Regulations 1987 SI 1987/91
Statutory Sick Pay (Additional Compensation of Employers) Amendment Regulations 1987 SI 1987/92
Betting, Gaming and Lotteries Act 1963 (Variation of Fees) (Scotland) Order 1987 SI 1987/93
Betting, Gaming and Lotteries Act 1963 (Variation of Fees) Order 1987 SI 1987/95
Education (Training Grants) Regulations 1987 SI 1987/96
Community Drivers' Hours (Passenger and Goods Vehicles) (Temporary Exception) (Revocation) Regulations 1987 SI 1987/97
Drivers' Hours (Passenger and Goods Vehicles) (Exemption) (Revocation) Regulations 1987 SI 1987/98
North West Water Authority (Solway Firth) Trout Close Season Order 1985 SI 1987/99
Birmingham—Great Yarmouth Trunk Road (High House and Other Diversions) (Amendment) Order 1987 SI 1987/100

101–200
Town and Country Planning (Fees for Applications and Deemed Applications) (Amendment) Regulations 1987 SI 1987/101
General Medical Council (Registration (Fees) (Amendment) Regulations) Order of Council 1987 SI 1987/102
Peterborough New Town (Exclusion of Land) Order 1987 SI 1987/104
A316 Trunk Road (Twickenham Road, Richmond Upon Thames) (Prescribed Routes) Order 1987 SI 1987/105
Social Security (Contributions) Amendment Regulations 1987 SI 1987/106
Welsh Water Authority (Llwyn Isaf Boreholes) (Discharge) Order 1987 SI 1987/107
Tayside and Fife Regions and Perth and Kinross District and Kirkcaldy District (Westfield) Boundaries Amendment Order 1987 SI 1987/112 (S. 9)
Welfare of Livestock (Prohibited Operations) (Amendment) Regulations 1987 SI 1987/114
Inner Urban Areas (Designated Districts) (Wales) Order 1987 SI 1987/115
Gas Cylinders (Pattern Approval) Regulations 1987 SI 1987/116
London Government Reorganisation (Housing Association Mortgages) Order 1987 SI 1987/117
Local Government Reorganisation (Capital Money) (Greater London) Order 1987 SI 1987/118
Prevention of Terrorism (Supplemental Temporary Provisions) (Amendment) Order 1987 SI 1987/119
 The North Norfolk (Parishes) Order 1987 S.I. 1987/120
 The Mid Sussex (Parishes) Order 1987 S.I. 1987/121
Assured Tenancies (Prescribed Amount) Order 1987 SI 1987/122
Video Recordings Act 1984 (Commencement No. 4) Order 1987 SI 1987/123
Preseli (Communities) Order 1987 SI 1987/124
London Regional Transport (Levy) Order 1987 SI 1987/125
Offshore Installations (Life-saving Appliances and Fire-fighting Equipment) (Amendment) Regulations 1987 SI 1987/129
Pensions Increase (Review) Order 1987 SI 1987/130
Authorised Officers (Meat Inspection) Regulations 1987 SI 1987/133
Agricultural Levy Reliefs (Frozen Beef and Veal) Order 1987 SI 1987/134
Brucellosis (Scotland) Amendment Order 1987 SI 1987/135
Hovercraft (Fees) (Amendment) Regulations 1987 SI 1987/136
Remuneration of Teachers (Primary and Secondary Education) (Amendment) Order 1987 SI 1987/137
Foreign Compensation Commission (Union of Soviet Socialist Republics) Rules Approval Instrument 1987 SI 1987/143
A34 Winchester—Preston Trunk Road (Peartree Hill Slip Roads) Order 1987 SI 1987/146
Excise Duties (Small Non-Commercial Consignments) Relief (Amendment) Regulations 1987 SI 1987/149
Value Added Tax (General) (Amendment) Regulations 1987 SI 1987/150
Welsh Health Promotion Authority (Establishment and Constitution) Order 1987 SI 1987/151
Welsh Health Promotion Authority Regulations 1987 SI 1987/152
Food Protection (Emergency Prohibitions) (England) (No. 2) Amendment Order 1987 SI 1987/153
Value Added Tax (Small Non-Commercial Consignments) Relief (Amendment) Order 1987 SI 1987/154
Value Added Tax (Imported Goods) Relief (Amendment) Order 1987 SI 1987/155
Police (Injury Benefit) Regulations 1987 SI 1987/156
Police Cadets (Pensions) (Amendment) Regulations 1987 SI 1987/157
Police Cadets (Injury Benefit) Regulations 1987 SI 1987/158
Special Constables (Injury Benefit) Regulations 1987 SI 1987/159
Video Recordings Act 1984 (Scotland) (Commencement No. 4) Order 1987 SI 1987/160
Local Authorities (Armorial Bearings) Order 1987 SI 1987/162
Child Abduction and Custody (Parties to Conventions) (Amendment) Order 1987 SI 1987/163
Foreign Compensation (Financial Provisions) Order 1987 SI 1987/164
Naval, Military and Air Forces etc. (Disablement and Death) Service Pensions Amendment Order 1987 SI 1987/165
Agriculture and Fisheries (Financial Assistance) (Northern Ireland) Order 1986 SI 1987/166
Education (Northern Ireland) Order 1987 SI 1987/167
Local Elections (Northern Ireland) (Amendment) Order 1987 SI 1987/168
Double Taxation Relief (Taxes on Income) (Ivory Coast) Order 1987 SI 1987/169
Trade Marks and Service Marks (Relevant Countries) (Amendment) Order 1987 SI 1987/170
Jersey (Navigator Hyperbolic System) Order 1987 SI 1987/171
Building Societies (Provision of Services) Order 1987 SI 1987/172
District of Carmarthen (Electoral Arrangements) Order 1987 SI 1987/176
Immigration (Ports of Entry) Order 1987 SI 1987/177
Housing and Planning Act 1986 (Commencement No. 2) Order 1987 SI 1987/178
Trafford Park Development Corporation (Area and Constitution) Order 1986 SI 1987/179
Control of Industrial Air Pollution (Transfer of Powers of Enforcement) Regulations 1987 SI 1987/180
Local Government (Direct Labour Organisations) (Competition) (Amendment) Regulations 1987 SI 1987/181
Food Protection (Emergency Prohibitions) (Wales) (No. 2) Amendment Order 1987 SI 1987/182
Petty Sessional Divisions (Northamptonshire) Order 1987 SI 1987/184
Seeds (National Lists of Varieties) (Fees) Regulations 1987 SI 1987/188
Plant Breeders' Rights (Fees) Regulations 1987 SI 1987/189
Personal Injuries (Civilians) Amendment Scheme 1987 SI 1987/191
Special Hospital Boards (Amendment of Constitution) Order 1987 SI 1987/192
 The Ellesmere Port and Neston (Parishes) Order 1987 S.I. 1987/195
 The Horsham (Parishes) Order 1987 S.I. 1987/196
 The Rushcliffe (Parishes) Order 1987 S.I. 1987/197
Public Order Act 1986 (Commencement No. 2) Order 1987 SI 1987/198
Offshore Installations (Safety Zones) (Revocation) (No. 2) Order 1987 SI 1987/199
Offshore Installations (Safety Zones) (No. 16) Order 1987 SI 1987/200

201–300
Offshore Installations (Safety Zones) (No. 17) Order 1987 SI 1987/201
Offshore Installations (Safety Zones) (No. 18) Order 1987 SI 1987/202
Offshore Installations (Safety Zones) (No. 19) Order 1987 SI 1987/203
Offshore Installations (Safety Zones) (No. 20) Order 1987 SI 1987/204
Offshore Installations (Safety Zones) (No. 21) Order 1987 SI 1987/205
Offshore Installations (Safety Zones) (No. 22) Order 1987 SI 1987/206
Representation of the People Act 1985 (Commencement No. 4) Order 1987 SI 1987/207
Education (Grants for Training of Teachers and Community Education Workers) (Scotland) Amendment Regulations 1987 SI 1987/208
Superannuation (Children's Pensions) (Earnings Limit) Order 1987 SI 1987/209
Export of Sheep (Prohibition) Order 1987 SI 1987/211
Milk and Dairies and Milk (Special Designation) (Charges) Regulations 1987 SI 1987/212
Sole (North Sea) (Enforcement of Community Conservation Measures) Order 1987 SI 1987/213
Social Security Commissioners Procedure Regulations 1987 SI 1987/214
Export of Goods (Control) (Amendment No. 8) Order 1987 SI 1987/215
Weights and Measures (Carriage of Solid Fuel by Rail) Order 1987 SI 1987/216
Several and Regulated Fisheries (Form of Application) Regulations 1987 SI 1987/217
Shellfish (Specification of Molluscs) Regulations 1987 SI 1987/218
Merchant Shipping (Indemnification of Shipowners) Order 1987 SI 1987/220
Nottinghamshire (District Boundaries) Order 1987 SI 1987/221
Harbour Authorities (Teignmouth) (Constitution) Order 1987 SI 1987/222
Diseases of Animals (Waste Food) (Amendment) Order 1987 SI 1987/232
Movement and Sale of Pigs (Amendment) Order 1987 SI 1987/233
Tendring Hundred Water Order 1987 SI 1987/234
Statutory Maternity Pay (Medical Evidence) Regulations 1987 SI 1987/235
Remuneration of Teachers (Primary and Secondary Education) (Amendment) (No. 2) Order 1987 SI 1987/236
Gaming Act (Variation of Fees) Order 1987 SI 1987/242
Lotteries (Gaming Board Fees) Order 1987 SI 1987/243
Merchant Shipping (Light Dues) (Amendment) Regulations 1987 SI 1987/244
National Health Service Functions (Amendment of Directions to Authorities) Regulations 1987 SI 1987/245
Export of Sheep (Prohibition) (Amendment) Order 1987 SI 1987/248
Food Protection (Emergency Prohibitions) (England) (No. 2) Amendment No. 2 Order 1987 SI 1987/249
Social Security (Notification of Deaths) Regulations 1987 SI 1987/250
County Council of West Midlands (Black Country Route) (Bridge over Birmingham Canal (Wolverhampton Level)) Scheme 1985 Confirmation Instrument 1987 SI 1987/251
County Council of West Midlands (M6 Motorway Junction 10) (Connecting Road) Scheme 1985 Confirmation Instrument 1987 SI 1987/252
Gaming Act (Variation of Fees) (Scotland)Order 1987 SI 1987/255
Police Pensions (Supplementary Provisions) Regulations 1987 SI 1987/256
Police Pensions Regulations 1987 SI 1987/257
Certification Officer (Amendment of Fees) Regulations 1987 SI 1987/258
Capital Gains Tax (Gilt-edged Securities) Order 1987 SI 1987/259
Local Elections (Parishes and Communities) (Amendment) Rules 1987 SI 1987/260
Local Elections (Principal Areas) (Amendment) Rules 1987 SI 1987/261
Parish and Community Meetings (Polls) (Amendment) Rules 1987 SI 1987/262
Food Protection (Emergency Prohibitions) (Wales) (No. 2) Amendment No. 2 Order 1987 SI 1987/263
Rent (Relief from Phasing) Order 1987 SI 1987/264
Protected Shorthold Tenancies (Rent Registration) Order 1987 SI 1987/265
Rent Act 1977 (Forms etc.) (Amendment) Regulations 1987 SI 1987/266
Protected Shorthold Tenancies (Notice to Tenant) Regulations 1987 SI 1987/267
Home Purchase Assistance (Price-limits) Order 1987 SI 1987/268
Civil Aviation (Navigation Services Charges) (Second Amendment) Regulations 1987 SI 1987/269
Food Protection (Emergency Prohibitions) (No.10) Revocation Order 1987 SI 1987/270
Export of Goods (Control) (Amendment No. 9) Order 1987 SI 1987/271
Data Protection (Fees) Regulations 1987 SI 1987/272
Prevention of Terrorism (Temporary Provisions) Act 1984 (Continuance) Order 1987 SI 1987/273
Rate Support Grant (Scotland) Order 1987 SI 1987/275
Family Income Supplements (General) Amendment Regulations 1987 SI 1987/281
Potato Marketing Scheme (Amendment) Order 1987 SI 1987/282
Swansea—Manchester Trunk Road (Newbridge, Ruabon and Johnstown By-pass and Slip Roads) Order 1982 (Variation) Order 1987 SI 1987/285
Nightwear (Safety) (Amendment) Regulations 1987 SI 1987/286
Designs (Amendment) Rules 1987 SI 1987/287
Patents (Amendment) Rules 1987 SI 1987/288
Legal Aid (Scotland) Act 1986 (Commencement No. 2) Order 1987 SI 1987/289
Schools General (Scotland) Amendment Regulations 1987 SI 1987/290
Education (Grants for Further Training of Teachers and Educational Psychologists) (Scotland) Regulations 1987 SI 1987/291
Third Country Fishing (Enforcement) Order 1987 SI 1987/292
Local Government Superannuation (Miscellaneous Provisions) Regulations 1987 SI 1987/293
Pilotage Commission Provision of Funds Scheme 1987 (Confirmation) Order 1987 SI 1987/295
Misuse of Drugs (Licence Fees) (Amendment) Regulations 1987 SI 1987/298
Prosecution of Offences (Custody Time Limits) Regulations 1987 SI 1987/299
Borough of Dinefwr (Electoral Arrangements) Order 1987 SI 1987/300

301–400
District of Preseli (Electoral Arrangements) Order 1987 SI 1987/301
Housing and Planning Act 1986 (Commencement No.3) Order 1987 SI 1987/304
Kent (District Boundaries) Order 1987 SI 1987/305
Merchant Shipping (Submersible Craft) (Amendment) Regulations 1987 SI 1987/306
Criminal Legal Aid (Scotland) Regulations 1987 SI 1987/307
Colleges of Education (Allowances to Governors:Prescribed Bodies) (Scotland) Regulations 1987 SI 1987/308
Colleges of Education (Scotland) Regulations 1987 SI 1987/309
Sugar Beet (Research and Education) Order 1987 SI 1987/310
Merchant Shipping (Submersible Craft Operations) Regulations 1987 SI 1987/311
General Betting Duty (Amendment) Regulations 1987 SI 1987/312
General Betting Duty (Northern Ireland) (Amendment) Regulations 1987 SI 1987/313
Spoilt Beer (Remission and Repayment of Duty) Regulations 1987 SI 1987/314
Motor Vehicles (Type Approval and Approval Marks) (Fees) (Amendment) Regulations 1987 SI 1987/315
Social Security (Earnings Factor) Amendment Regulations 1987 SI 1987/316
Social Security (Unemployment, Sickness and Invalidity Benefit) Amendment Regulations 1987 SI 1987/317
General Drainage Charge (Anglian Water Authority) (Ascertainment) Order 1987 SI 1987/318
London—Fishguard Trunk Road (A48) (County of West Glamorgan) and The Swansea—Manchester Trunk Road (A483) (Penllergaer Roundabout, M4 to A483/A4070 Ivorites Junction) Detrunking Order 1987 SI 1987/319
London—Fishguard Trunk Road (A48) (County of South Glamorgan) and The Cardiff—Glan Conwy Trunk Road (A470) (County of South Glamorgan) Detrunking Order 1987 SI 1987/320
London—Fishguard Trunk Road (A48) (County of Mid Glamorgan) Detrunking Order 1987 SI 1987/321
London—Fishguard Trunk Road (A48) and The Newhouse—High Beech Principal Road (A466) (County of Gwent) Order 1987 SI 1987/322
(A17) King's Lynn-Sleaford-Newark Trunk Road (Long Sutton-Sutton Bridge Bypass) Order 1987 SI 1987/326
Social Security Benefits Up-rating Regulations 1987 SI 1987/327
(A17) King's Lynn-Sleaford-Newark Trunk Road (Long Sutton-Sutton Bridge Bypass Detrunking) Order 1987 SI 1987/328
National Savings Bank (Investment Deposits) (Limits) (Amendment) Order 1987 SI 1987/329
Savings Banks (Ordinary Deposits) (Limits) (Amendment) Order 1987 SI 1987/330
Housing Support Grant (Scotland) Variation Order 1987 SI 1987/331
Housing Support Grant (Scotland) Order 1987 SI 1987/332
Scottish Solicitors' Discipline Tribunal (Increase of Maximum Fine) Order 1987 SI 1987/333
Hamilton and East Kilbride Districts (Spectacle E'e Falls, Sandford) Boundaries Amendment Order 1987 SI 1987/334 (S. 24)
Social Security (Industrial Injuries) (Prescribed Diseases) Amendment Regulations 1987 SI 1987/335
Transport Act 1985 (Modifications in Schedule 4 to the Transport Act 1968) (Amendment) Order 1987 SI 1987/337
Hereford and Worcester (District Boundaries) Order 1987 for the purposes described SI 1987/338
Buckinghamshire (District Boundaries) Order 1987 SI 1987/339
Import and Export (Plant Health Fees) (England and Wales) Order 1987 SI 1987/340
Police (Injury Benefit) (Amendment) Regulations 1987 SI 1987/341
Police Cadets (Injury Benefit) (Amendment) Regulations 1987 SI 1987/342
Special Constables (Injury Benefit) (Amendment) Regulations 1987 SI 1987/343
Education (No. 2) Act 1986 (Commencement No. 2) Order 1987 SI 1987/344
Revaluation Rate Rebates (Scotland) Order 1986 SI 1987/345
Motor Vehicles (Competitions and Trials) (Scotland) Amendment Regulations 1987 SI 1987/346
Block Grant (Education Adjustments) (England) Regulations 1987 SI 1987/347
Housing and Planning Act 1986 (Commencement No. 4) Order 1987 SI 1987/348
Town and Country Planning (Listed Buildings and Buildings in Conservation Areas) Regulations 1987 SI 1987/349
Insurance (Fees) Regulations 1987 SI 1987/350
Local Government (Prescribed Expenditure) (Amendment) Regulations 1987 SI 1987/351
Pension Scheme Surpluses (Administration) Regulations 1987 SI 1987/352
Road Traffic Accidents (Payments for Treatment) Order 1987 SI 1987/353
Social Security Act 1986 (Commencement No. 5) Order 1987 SI 1987/354
Social Security Benefit (Dependency) Amendment Regulations 1987 SI 1987/355
Combined Probation Areas (Northamptonshire) Order 1987 SI 1987/356
Child Benefit (General) Amendment Regulations 1987 SI 1987/357
Supplementary Benefit (Conditions of Entitlement) Amendment Regulations 1987 SI 1987/358
Block Grant (Education Adjustments) (Wales) Regulations 1987 SI 1987/359
Land Registration (District Registries) Order 1987 SI 1987/360
Diseases of Animals (Waste Food) (Fees for Licences) Order 1987 SI 1987/361
Capital Allowances (Corresponding Northern Ireland Grants) Order 1987 SI 1987/362
Crown Roads (Royal Parks) (Application of Road Traffic Enactments) Order 1987 SI 1987/363
National Assistance (Charges for Accommodation) (Scotland) Regulations 1987 SI 1987/364
Criminal Legal Aid (Scotland) (Fees) Regulations 1987 SI 1987/365
Civil Legal Aid (Scotland) (Fees) Regulations 1987 SI 1987/366
National Health Service (Charges for Drugs and Appliances) (Scotland) Amendment Regulations 1987 SI 1987/367
National Health Service (Charges for Drugs and Appliances) Amendment Regulations 1987 SI 1987/368
Legal Aid in Criminal Proceedings (Costs) (Amendment) Regulations 1987 SI 1987/369
National Assistance (Charges for Accommodation) Regulations 1987 SI 1987/370
National Health Service (Charges to Overseas Visitors) Amendment Regulations 1987 SI 1987/371
Statutory Sick Pay (General) Amendment Regulations 1987 SI 1987/372
Judicial Pensions (Requisite Benefits) Order 1987 SI 1987/373
Judicial Pensions (Preservation of Benefits) Order 1987 SI 1987/374
Judicial Pensions (Widows' and Children's Benefits) Regulations 1987 SI 1987/375
Superannuation (Judicial Offices) (Aggregation of Service) Rules 1987 SI 1987/376
Industrial Assurance (Fees) Regulations 1987 SI 1987/377
Building Societies (Non-Retail Funds and Deposits) Order 1987 SI 1987/378
Civil Aviation Authority (Amendment) Regulations 1987 SI 1987/379
Airports Byelaws (Designation) Order 1987 SI 1987/380
Civil Legal Aid (Scotland) Regulations 1987 SI 1987/381
Advice and Assistance (Scotland) Regulations 1987 SI 1987/382
Smoke Control Areas (Exempted Fireplaces) (Scotland) Order 1987 SI 1987/383
Legal Aid (Scotland) (Children) Regulations 1987 SI 1987/384
National Health Service (General Medical and Pharmaceutical Services) (Scotland) Amendment Regulations 1987 SI 1987/385
National Health Service (General Medical and Pharmaceutical Services) (Scotland) Amendment (No. 2) Regulations 1987 SI 1987/386
National Health Service (Charges to Overseas Visitors) (Scotland) Amendment Regulations 1987 SI 1987/387
Legal Advice and Assistance at Police Stations (Remuneration) (Amendment) Regulations 1987 SI 1987/388
Local Land Charges (Amendment) Rules 1987 SI 1987/389
Artificial Insemination (Cattle and Pigs) (Fees) Regulations 1987 SI 1987/390
Building Societies (General Charge and Fees) Regulations 1987 SI 1987/391
Friendly Societies (Fees) Regulations 1987 SI 1987/392
Industrial and Provident Societies (Credit Unions) (Amendment of Fees) Regulations 1987 SI 1987/393
Building Societies Act 1986 (Accounts and Related Transitional Provisions) Order 1987 SI 1987/395
Legal Advice and Assistance (Financial Conditions) (No. 2) Regulations 1987 SI 1987/396
Acquisition of Land (Rate of Interest after Entry) (Scotland) Regulations 1987 SI 1987/397
Remuneration of Teachers (Primary and Secondary Education) (Amendment) (No. 3) Order 1987 SI 1987/398
National Health Service (Amendment) Act 1986 (Commencement No. 1) Order 1987 SI 1987/399
Pneumoconiosis, Byssinosis and Miscellaneous Diseases Benefit (Amendment) Scheme 1987 SI 1987/400

401–500
National Health Service (General Medical and Pharmaceutical Services) Amendment (No. 2) Regulations 1987 SI 1987/401
Control of Pollution (Landed Ships' Waste) Regulations 1987 SI 1987/402
Public Trustee (Fees) (Amendment) Order 1987 SI 1987/403
Income Tax (Interest Relief) (Housing Associations) (No. 3) Regulations 1987 SI 1987/404
Acquisition of Land (Rate of Interest after Entry) Regulations 1987 SI 1987/405
Maternity Pay and Maternity Allowance (Transitional) Regulations 1987 SI 1987/406
National Health Service (General Medical and Pharmaceutical Services) Amendment (No. 3) Regulations 1987 SI 1987/407
Merchant Shipping (Seamen's Documents) Regulations 1987 SI 1987/408
Social Security (Medical Evidence) Amendment Regulations 1987 SI 1987/409
Milk (Community Outgoers Scheme) (England and Wales) (Amendment) Regulations 1987 SI 1987/410
Social Security (Earnings Factor) Amendment (No. 2) Regulations 1987 SI 1987/411
Pension Scheme Surpluses (Valuation) Regulations 1987 SI 1987/412
Social Security (Contributions) Amendment (No. 2) Regulations 1987 SI 1987/413
Social Security (Credits) Amendment Regulations 1987 SI 1987/414
Social Security (Industrial Injuries) (Reduced Earnings Allowance and Transitional) Regulations 1987 SI 1987/415
Social Security (Maternity Allowance) Regulations 1987 SI 1987/416
Social Security (Maternity Allowance) (Work Abroad) Regulations 1987 SI 1987/417
Statutory Maternity Pay (Persons Abroad and Mariners) Regulations 1987 SI 1987/418
Workmen's Compensation (Supplementation) Amendment Scheme 1987 SI 1987/419
Padstow Harbour Revision Order 1987 SI 1987/420
Legal Aid in Criminal Proceedings (General) (Amendment) Regulations 1987 SI 1987/422
Police (Scotland) Amendment Regulations 1987 SI 1987/423
Police Cadets (Scotland) Amendment Regulations 1987 SI 1987/424
Milk (Community Outgoers' Scheme) (Scotland) Amendment Regulations 1987 SI 1987/425
Building Societies Act 1986 (Meetings) (Transitional Provisions) Order 1987 SI 1987/426
Act of Sederunt (Legal Aid Rules) (Children) 1987 SI 1987/427
Import and Export (Plant Health) (Great Britain) (Amendment) Order 1987 SI 1987/428
Workmen's Compensation (Supplementation) Amendment (No. 2) Scheme 1987 SI 1987/429
Act of Adjournal (Criminal Legal Aid Rules) 1987 SI 1987/430
Civil Legal Aid (Scotland) Amendment Regulations 1987 SI 1987/431
Valuation Timetable (Scotland) Amendment Order 1987 SI 1987/432
Town and Country Planning (Compensation for Restrictions on Mineral Workings) (Scotland) Regulations 1987 SI 1987/433
Income Tax (Indexation) Order 1987 SI 1987/434
Inheritance Tax (Indexation) Order 1987 SI 1987/435
Capital Gains Tax (Annual Exempt Amount) Order 1987 SI 1987/436
Value Added Tax (Charities) Order 1987 SI 1987/437
Value Added Tax (Increase of Registration Limits) Order 1987 SI 1987/438
Police and Criminal Evidence Act 1984 (Application to Customs and Excise) Order 1987 SI 1987/439
Transfer of Undertakings (Protection of Employment) (Amendment) Regulations 1987 SI 1987/442
Legal Advice and Representation (Duty Solicitor) (Remuneration) Regulations 1987 SI 1987/443
Public Record Office (Fees) Regulations 1987 SI 1987/444
National Health Service (Service Committees and Tribunal) Amendment Regulations 1987 SI 1987/445
Nurses, Midwives and Health Visitors (Entry to Training Requirements) Amendment Rules Approval Order 1987 SI 1987/446
Veterinary Surgeons Qualifications (EEC Recognition) (Spanish and Portuguese Qualifications) Order 1987 SI 1987/447
European Communities (Designation) Order 1987 SI 1987/448
House of Commons Disqualification Order 1987 SI 1987/449
Anguilla (Public Seal) Order 1987 SI 1987/450
Aviation Security (Anguilla) Order 1987 SI 1987/451
Fugitive Offenders (Anguilla) Order 1987 SI 1987/452
Genocide (Anguilla) Order 1987 SI 1987/453
Internationally Protected Persons (Anguilla) Order 1987 SI 1987/454
Taking of Hostages (Anguilla) Order 1987 SI 1987/455
Tokyo Convention (Anguilla) Order 1987 SI 1987/456
General Medical Council (Constitution) Amendment Order 1987 SI 1987/457
Agriculture (Environmental Areas) (Northern Ireland) Order 1987 SI 1987/458
Appropriation (Northern Ireland) Order 1987 SI 1987/459
Audit (Northern Ireland) Order 1987 SI 1987/460
Education (Corporal Punishment) (Northern Ireland) Order 1987 SI 1987/461
Parliamentary Constituencies (England) (Miscellaneous Changes) Order 1987 SI 1987/462
Public Order (Northern Ireland) Order 1987 SI 1987/463
Social Fund (Maternity and Funeral Expenses) (Northern Ireland) Order 1987 SI 1987/464
Transfer of Functions (Immigration Appeals) Order 1987 SI 1987/465
Double Taxation Relief (Taxes on Income) (France) Order 1987 SI 1987/466
Double Taxation Relief (Taxes on Income) (Mauritius) Order 1987 SI 1987/467
Reciprocal Enforcement of Foreign Judgments (Canada) Order 1987 SI 1987/468
Parliamentary Constituencies (Scotland) (Miscellaneous Changes) Order 1987 SI 1987/469
Merchant Shipping (Prevention and Control of Pollution) Order 1987 SI 1987/470
London—Brighton Trunk Road (A23 Hickstead) Order 1987 SI 1987/472
London—Brighton Trunk Road (A23 Hickstead Slip Roads) Order 1987 SI 1987/473
London—Brighton Trunk Road (A23 Warninglid Flyover—South of Bolney) Order 1987 SI 1987/474
 The Adur (Parishes) Order 1987 S.I. 1987/475
 The Barrow-in-Furness (Parishes) Order 1987 S.I. 1987/476
 The Sevenoaks (Parishes) Order 1987 S.I. 1987/477
 The Chelmsford (Parishes) Order 1987 S.I. 1987/478
 The South Ribble (Parishes) Order 1987 S.I. 1987/479
Social Fund Maternity and Funeral Expenses (General) Regulations 1987 SI 1987/481
Borough of Chelmsford (Electoral Arrangements) Order 1987 SI 1987/483
Borough of South Ribble (Electoral Arrangements) Order 1987 SI 1987/484
District of Kingswood (Electoral Arrangements) Order 1987 SI 1987/485
District of Montgomeryshire (Electoral Arrangements) Order 1987 SI 1987/486
A40 London—Fishguard Trunk Road (Swakeleys Road Junction Improvement Trunk Road and Slip Roads) Order 1987 SI 1987/490
Social Security (Payments on account, Overpayments and Recovery) Regulations 1987 SI 1987/491
Act of Sederunt (Civil Legal Aid Rules) 1987 SI 1987/492
County Court (Amendment) Rules 1987 SI 1987/493
 The Solihull (Parishes) Order 1987 S.I. 1987/494
 The Leominster (Parishes) Order 1987 S.I. 1987/495
 The South Shropshire (Parishes) Order 1987 S.I. 1987/496
 The Canterbury (Parishes) Order 1987 S.I. 1987/497
Seed Potatoes (Fees) (Scotland) Regulations 1987 SI 1987/498
Education (Bursaries for Teacher Training) (Amendment) Regulations 1987 SI 1987/499

501–600
Value Added Tax (General) (Amendment) (No. 2) Regulations 1987 SI 1987/510
PARLIAMENT SI 1987/511
Income Tax (Official Rate of Interest on Beneficial Loans) Order 1987 SI 1987/512
Income Tax (Interest on Unpaid Tax and Repayment Supplement) Order 1987 SI 1987/513
Stamp Duty Reserve Tax (Interest on Tax Repaid) Order 1987 SI 1987/514
Stamp Duty (Exempt Instruments) Regulations 1987 SI 1987/516
Value Added Tax (Betting, Gaming and Lotteries) Order 1987 SI 1987/517
Value Added Tax (International Services) Order 1987 SI 1987/518
Petty Sessional Divisions (Northamptonshire) (Amendment) Order 1987 SI 1987/519
Industry Act 1980 (Increase of Limit) Order 1987 SI 1987/520
North East of Birmingham – Nottingham Trunk Road The Birmingham – Nottingham Route (Ashby-de-la-Zouch Slip Roads) Order 1987 SI 1987/521
North East of Birmingham—Nottingham Trunk Road The Birmingham—Nottingham Route (Appleby Magna to Kegworth Section and Slip Roads) (Variation) Order 1987 SI 1987/522
(A453) North East of Birmingham—Nottingham Trunk Road (Appleby Magna to Ashby-de-la-Zouch) Detrunking Order 1987 SI 1987/523
Motor Vehicles (Type Approval) (Amendment) Regulations 1987 SI 1987/524
Injuries in War (Shore Employments) Compensation (Amendment) Scheme 1987 SI 1987/529
Income Tax (Entertainers and Sportsmen) Regulations 1987 SI 1987/530
(A452) London-Holyhead Trunk Road (De-Trunking from Streetly to Erdington) Order 1987 SI 1987/531
Social Security Act 1986 (Commencement No. 6) Order 1987 SI 1987/543
Cheshire County Council (Forrest Way Bridge, Warrington) Scheme 1986 Confirmation Instrument 1987 SI 1987/544
Foreign Fields (Specification) (No. 1) Order 1987 SI 1987/545
(A16) Norman Cross—Grimsby Trunk Road (Diversion between London Road, Boston and Algarkirk) (Variation) Order 1987 SI 1987/546
Seed Potatoes (Amendment) Regulations 1987 SI 1987/547
Merchant Shipping (Fees) (Amendment) Regulations 1987 SI 1987/548
Merchant Shipping (IBC Code) Regulations 1987 SI 1987/549
Merchant Shipping (BCH Code) Regulations 1987 SI 1987/550
Merchant Shipping (Control of Pollution by Noxious Liquid Substances in Bulk) Regulations 1987 SI 1987/551
Southern Water Authority (Romney Marsh Levels Internal Drainage District) Order 1987 SI 1987/555
Gipsy Encampments (City of Lancaster) Order 1987 SI 1987/556
Motor Vehicles (Driving Licences) (Amendment) Regulations 1987 SI 1987/560
Local Elections (Communities) (Welsh Forms) Order 1987 SI 1987/561
Local Elections (Principal Areas) (Welsh Forms) Order 1987 SI 1987/562
Disabled Persons (Services, Consultation and Representation) Act 1986 (Commencement No. 1) Order 1987 SI 1987/564
War Pensions (Mercantile Marine) (Amendment) Scheme 1987 SI 1987/585
Merchant Shipping (Reporting of Pollution Incidents) Regulations 1987 SI 1987/586
British Council and Commonwealth Institute Superannuation Act 1986 (Commencement No. 2) Order 1987 SI 1987/588
Offshore Installations (Safety Zones) (No. 23) Order 1987 SI 1987/591
Offshore Installations (Safety Zones) (No. 24) Order 1987 SI 1987/592
Offshore Installations (Safety Zones) (No. 25) Order 1987 SI 1987/593
Offshore Installations (Safety Zones) (No. 26) Order 1987 SI 1987/594
Offshore Installations (Safety Zones) (Revocation) (No. 3) Order 1987 SI 1987/595

601–700
Plugs and Sockets etc. (Safety) Regulations 1987 SI 1987/603
New Valuation Lists (Time and Class of Hereditaments) Order 1987 SI 1987/604
Health and Safety (Fees) Regulations 1987 SI 1987/605
Social Security Benefit (Computation of Earnings) Amendment Regulations 1987 SI 1987/606
Industrial Training Levy (Engineering Board) Order 1987 SI 1987/607
Gaming Act (Variation of Monetary Limits) Order 1987 SI 1987/608
Gaming Clubs (Hours and Charges) (Amendment) Regulations 1987 SI 1987/609
Patents (Fees) Rules 1987 SI 1987/610
British Citizenship (Designated Service) (Amendment) Order 1987 SI 1987/611
Northumbrian Water Authority (T Nets) (Northern Area) Order 1987 SI 1987/612
Mid Southern Water Order 1987 SI 1987/613
A406 Trunk Road (Hanger Lane, Ealing) (Prohibition of Left Turn) Order 1987 SI 1987/617
 The Kennet (Parishes) Order 1987 S.I. 1987/619
 The Chichester (Parishes) Order 1987 S.I. 1987/620
 The Wycombe (Parishes) Order 1987 S.I. 1987/621
Civil Defence (Grant) (Amendment) Regulations 1987 SI 1987/622
Financial Services Act 1986 (Commencement) (No. 4) Order 1987 SI 1987/623
 The Ashford (Parishes) Order 1987 S.I. 1987/624
Smoke Control Areas (Authorised Fuels) Regulations 1987 SI 1987/625
Milk Quota (Calculation of Standard Quota) (Amendment) Order 1987 SI 1987/626
Legal Advice and Assistance (Financial Conditions) Regulations 1987 SI 1987/627
Legal Aid (Financial Conditions) Regulations 1987 SI 1987/628
Gaming Act (Variation of Monetary Limits) (Scotland) Order 1987 SI 1987/630
Gaming Clubs (Hours and Charges) (Scotland) Amendment Regulations 1987 SI 1987/631
Forestry (Felling of Trees) (Amendment) Regulations 1987 SI 1987/632
 The Waveney (Parishes) Order 1987 S.I. 1987/633
Merchant Shipping Act 1979 (Commencement No. 11) Order 1987 SI 1987/635
Advice and Assistance (Assistance by Way of Representation) (Scotland) Regulations 1987 SI 1987/642
Scottish Land Court (Fees) Amendment Rules 1987 SI 1987/643
Education (Grants for Further Training of Teachers and Educational Psychologists) (Scotland) (No.2) Regulations 1987 SI 1987/644
Cardiff Bay Development Corporation (Area and Constitution) Order 1987 SI 1987/646
 The East Lindsey (Parishes) Order 1987 S.I. 1987/647
 The South Bucks (Parishes) Order 1987 S.I. 1987/648
Seed Potatoes (Fees) Regulations 1987 SI 1987/649
Education (School Teachers' Pay and Conditions of Employment) Order 1987 SI 1987/650
Local Government Reorganisation (Property) (South Yorkshire) Order 1987 SI 1987/651
Environmentally Sensitive Areas (Breadalbane) Designation Order 1987 SI 1987/653
Environmentally Sensitive Areas (Loch Lomond) Designation Order 1987 SI 1987/654
Social Security (Class 1 Contributions—Contracted-out Percentages) Order 1987 SI 1987/656
State Scheme Premiums (Actuarial Tables) Regulations 1987 SI 1987/657
State Scheme Premiums (Actuarial Tables – Transitional Provisions) Regulations 1987 SI 1987/658
Supplementary Benefit (Requirements and Resources) Amendment and Uprating Regulations 1987 SI 1987/659
Supplementary Benefit (Resources) Amendment Regulations 1987 SI 1987/660
Parliamentary Commissioner Order 1987 SI 1987/661
Bermuda (Evidence) Order 1987 SI 1987/662
Foreign Compensation (Union of Soviet Socialist Republics) (Distribution) Order 1987 SI 1987/663
Merchant Shipping (Prevention and Control of Pollution) (Hong Kong) Order 1987 SI 1987/664
Food and Environment Protection Act 1985 (Guernsey) Order 1987 SI 1987/665
Food and Environment Protection Act 1985 (Isle of Man) Order 1987 SI 1987/666
Food and Environment Protection Act 1985 (Jersey) Order 1987 SI 1987/667
Nuclear Installations (Isle of Man) (Variation) Order 1987 SI 1987/668
Statistics of Trade Act 1947 (Amendment of Schedule) Order 1987 SI 1987/669
Carriage of Passengers and their Luggage by Sea (Domestic Carriage) Order 1987 SI 1987/670
Home-Grown Cereals Authority Levy Scheme (Approval) Order 1987 SI 1987/671
Cable and Broadcasting Act 1984 (Commencement No.3) Order 1987 SI 1987/672
Broadcasting (Extension of Duration of IBA's Function) Order 1987 SI 1987/673
Medicines (Products Other Than Veterinary Drugs) (Prescription Only) Amendment Order 1987 SI 1987/674
Motor Cycles (Eye Protectors) (Amendment) Regulations 1987 SI 1987/675
Road Vehicles (Construction and Use) (Amendment) Regulations 1987 SI 1987/676
Civil Defence (Grant) (Scotland) Amendment Regulations 1987 SI 1987/677
Social Security (Credits) Amendment (No. 2) Regulations 1987 SI 1987/687
Social Security (Unemployment, Sickness and Invalidity Benefit) Amendment (No. 2) Regulations 1987 SI 1987/688
National Library of Wales (Delivery of Books) (Amendment) Order 1987 SI 1987/698
(A19) East of Snaith-York-Thirsk-Stockton-on-Tees-Sunderland Trunk Road (Burnhope Way Roundabout Grade Separated Junction) Order 1987 SI 1987/699
Opencast Coal (Rate of Interest on Compensation) Order 1987 SI 1987/700

701–800
Town and Country Planning (Appeals) (Written Representations Procedure) Regulations 1987 SI 1987/701
Town and Country Planning General Development (Amendment) Order 1987 SI 1987/702
Carriage of Passengers and their Luggage by Sea (Notice) Order 1987 SI 1987/703
Advice and Assistance (Financial Conditions) (Scotland) Regulations 1987 SI 1987/704
Civil Legal Aid (Financial Conditions) (Scotland) Regulations 1987 SI 1987/705
A49 Shrewsbury–Whitchurch–Warrington Trunk Road (Prees By-Pass) Order 1987 SI 1987/707
Designation of Local Authority (Portsmouth Port Health District) Order 1987 SI 1987/709
Agricultural Holdings (Arbitration on Notices) Order 1987 SI 1987/710
Agricultural Holdings (Forms of Notice to Pay Rent or to Remedy) Regulations 1987 SI 1987/711
Offshore Installations (Safety Zones) (No. 27) Order 1987 SI 1987/713
Crown Court (Advance Notice of Expert Evidence) Rules 1987 SI 1987/716
Industrial Training Levy (Plastics Processing) Order 1987 SI 1987/717
Saithe (Specified Sea Areas) (Prohibition of Fishing) Order 1987 SI 1987/718
Merchant Shipping Act 1979 (Commencement No. 12) Order 1987 SI 1987/719
A316 (County of Surrey Boundary to M3 Trunking) Order 1987 SI 1987/720
Building Societies (Prescribed Bands for Disclosure) Order 1987 SI 1987/723
Disabled Persons (Services, Consultation and Representation) Act 1986 (Commencement No. 2) Order 1987 SI 1987/729
Meters (Certification) Order 1987 SI 1987/730
Milk Marketing Scheme (Amendment) Regulations 1987 SI 1987/735
National Health Service (General Dental Services) Amendment Regulations 1987 SI 1987/736
Assured Tenancies (Approved Bodies) (No. 1) Order 1987 SI 1987/737
Town and Country Planning (Trafford Park Urban Development Area) Special Development Order 1987 SI 1987/738
Trafford Park Development Corporation (Planning Functions) Order 1987 SI 1987/739
Aberdeen and District Milk Marketing Scheme (Amendment) Approval Order 1987 SI 1987/740
North West Water Authority (Returns of Eels Taken) Order 1986 SI 1987/745
Merchant Shipping (Light Dues) (Amendment No. 2) Regulations 1987 SI 1987/746
Civil Aviation Act 1980 (Government Shareholding) Order 1987 SI 1987/747
Cambridge Water Order 1987 SI 1987/750
Trade Marks and Service Marks (Fees) Rules 1987 SI 1987/751
Companies (Forms) (Amendment) Regulations 1987 SI 1987/752
Patents (Fees) (Amendment) Rules 1987 SI 1987/753
Housing and Planning Act 1986 (Commencement No. 5) Order 1987 SI 1987/754
Secure Tenancies (Notices) Regulations 1987 SI 1987/755
Customs and Excise (Community Transit) Regulations 1987 SI 1987/763
Town and Country Planning (Use Classes) Order 1987 SI 1987/764
Town and Country Planning General Development (Amendment) (No. 2) Order 1987 SI 1987/765
Coal Industry (Restructuring Grants) Order 1987 SI 1987/770
Court of Session etc. Fees Amendment (No.2) Order 1987 SI 1987/771
High Court of Justiciary Fees Amendment Order 1987 SI 1987/772
Patronage (Benefices) Rules 1987 SI 1987/773
Wireless Telegraphy (Cordless Telephone Apparatus) (Restriction) Order 1987 SI 1987/774
Wireless Telegraphy (Exemption) (Amendment) (Cordless Telephone Apparatus) Regulations 1987 SI 1987/775
Wireless Telegraphy (Exemption) (Amendment) (Model Control Apparatus) Regulations 1987 SI 1987/776
Value Added Tax (Construction of Buildings) Order 1987 SI 1987/781
Control of Pollution (Anti-Fouling Paints and Treatments) Regulations 1987 SI 1987/783
Heathrow Taxi Sharing Scheme Order 1987 SI 1987/784
Rate Limitation (Designation of Authorities) (Exemption) Order 1987 SI 1987/785
Rate Limitation (Designation of Authorities) (Exemption) (Wales) Order 1987 SI 1987/786
Administration of Justice Act 1985 (Commencement No.4) Order 1987 SI 1987/787
Licensed Conveyancers' Discipline and Appeals Committee (Legal Assessor) Rules 1987 SI 1987/788
Licensed Conveyancers' Discipline and Appeals Committee (Procedure) Rules Approval Order 1987 SI 1987/789
Infectious Diseases of Horses Order 1987 SI 1987/790
Devon County Council (Exeter, River Exe Bridge) Scheme 1985 Confirmation Instrument 1987 SI 1987/791
London—Penzance Trunk Road A303 (Sparkford Bypass) Order 1987 SI 1987/792
London—Penzance Trunk Road A303 (Sparkford Bypass) (Detrunking) Order 1987 SI 1987/793
Valuation Timetable (Scotland) Amendment (No. 2) Order 1987 SI 1987/794
Building (Inner London) Regulations 1987 SI 1987/798
Family Provision (Intestate Succession) Order 1987 SI 1987/799
Fresh Meat Export (Hygiene and Inspection) (Scotland) Regulations 1987 SI 1987/800

801–900
Unlicensed Place of Refreshment Wages Council (Variation) Order 1987 SI 1987/801
Measuring Instruments (EEC Initial Verification Requirements) (Fees) (Amendment) Regulations 1987 SI 1987/802
Measuring Instruments (EEC Pattern Approval Requirements) (Fees) Regulations 1987 SI 1987/803
Town and Country Planning (Control of Advertisements) (Amendment) Regulations 1987 SI 1987/804
Community Drivers' Hours and Recording Equipment (Exemptions and Supplementary Provisions) (Amendment) Regulations 1987 SI 1987/805
Value Added Tax (Terminal Markets) (Amendment) Order 1987 SI 1987/806
Disablement Services Authority (Establishment and Constitution) Order 1987 SI 1987/808
Disablement Services Authority Regulations 1987 SI 1987/809
Offshore Installations (Safety Zones) (No. 28) Order 1987 SI 1987/812
Offshore Installations (Safety Zones) (No. 29) Order 1987 SI 1987/813
Offshore Installations (Safety Zones) (No. 30) Order 1987 SI 1987/814
Anglian Water Authority (Littleport and Downham Internal Drainage District) Order 1987 SI 1987/815
Petroleum Act 1987 (Commencement No. 1) Order 1987 SI 1987/820
Court Funds Rules 1987 SI 1987/821
Assured Tenancies (Approved Bodies) (No.2) Order 1987 SI 1987/822
Civil Legal Aid (Scotland) (Fees) Amendment Regulations 1987 SI 1987/823
Criminal Legal Aid (Scotland) (Fees) Amendment Regulations 1987 SI 1987/824
Legal Aid (Scotland) (Fees in Civil Proceedings) Amendment Regulations 1987 SI 1987/825
Legal Aid (Scotland) (Fees in Criminal Proceedings) Amendment Regulations 1987 SI 1987/826
Public Telecommunication System Designation (British Cable Services Limited) Order 1987 SI 1987/827
Sheep Scab (Amendment) Order 1987 SI 1987/836
Sumburgh Airport Shops Order 1987 SI 1987/837
Sumburgh Airport Licensing (Liquor) Order 1987 SI 1987/838
London (British Rail) Taxi Sharing Scheme Order 1987 SI 1987/839
A604 Catthorpe-Harwich Trunk Road (Thrapston to Brampton Section and Slip Roads) Order (No.2) 1987 SI 1987/840
Goods Vehicles (Operators' Licences, Qualifications and Fees) (Amendment) Regulations 1987 SI 1987/841
Bristol Waterworks Order 1987 SI 1987/842
Sullom Voe, Shetland, Pilotage (Amendment) Order 1987 SI 1987/843
Income Tax (Building Societies) (Amendment) Regulations 1987 SI 1987/844
Police Regulations 1987 SI 1987/851
Public Order Act 1986 (Commencement No. 3) Order 1987 SI 1987/852
Public Order (Football Exclusion) Order 1987 SI 1987/853
Merchant Shipping (Fees) (Amendment) (No. 2) Regulations 1987 SI 1987/854
Carriage of Passengers and their Luggage by Sea (United Kingdom Carriers) Order 1987 SI 1987/855
Treaty of Peace (Bulgaria) Vesting Order 1948 Revocation Order 1987 SI 1987/856
Treaty of Peace (Hungary) Vesting Order 1948 Revocation Order 1987 SI 1987/857
Treaty of Peace (Roumania) Vesting Order 1948 Revocation Order 1987 SI 1987/858
Financial Services (Disclosure of Information) (Designated Authorities No.2) Order 1987. SI 1987/859
Value Added Tax (Finance) Order 1987 SI 1987/860
Social Security Revaluation of Earnings Factors Order 1987 SI 1987/861
Wages Councils (Meetings and Procedure) Regulations 1987 SI 1987/862
Wages Councils (Notices) Regulations 1987 SI 1987/863
Students' Allowances (Scotland) Regulations 1987 SI 1987/864
Act of Sederunt (Fees of Solicitors in the Sheriff Court) (Amendment) 1987 SI 1987/865
Gas Act 1986 (Government Shareholding) Order 1987 SI 1987/866
Importation of Bees (Amendment) Order 1987 SI 1987/867
Statutory Sick Pay (General) Amendment (No.2) Regulations 1987 SI 1987/868
International Carriage of Perishable Foodstuffs (Vehicles With Thin Side Walls) Regulations 1987 SI 1987/869
Milk Quota (Calculation of Standard Quota) (Scotland) Amendment (No. 2) Order 1987 SI 1987/870
Act of Sederunt (Rules of Court Amendment No. 2) (Solicitors' Fees) 1987 SI 1987/871
Stansted Airport Aircraft Movement Limit Order 1987 SI 1987/874
British Nuclear Fuels plc (Financial Limit) Order 1987 SI 1987/875
Lawnmowers (Harmonization of Noise Emission Standards) (Amendment) Regulations 1987 SI 1987/876
Medicines (Child Safety) Amendment Regulations 1987 SI 1987/877
Social Security (Claims and Payments) Amendment Regulations 1987 SI 1987/878
Education (Schools and Further Education) (Amendment) Regulations 1987 SI 1987/879
Import and Export (Plant Health Fees) (Scotland) Order 1987 SI 1987/880
Milk (Community Outgoers' Scheme) (Scotland) Amendment (No. 2) Regulations 1987 SI 1987/881
Milk (Cessation of Production) (Scotland) Scheme 1987 SI 1987/882
Advice and Assistance (Scotland) Amendment Regulations 1987 SI 1987/883
Merchant Shipping (Certification of Deck and Marine Engineer Officers and Licensing of Marine Engine Operators) (Amendment) Regulations 1987 SI 1987/884
Food Protection (Emergency Prohibitions) (Wales) (No. 2) Amendment No. 3 Order 1987 SI 1987/885
Income Tax (Official Rate of Interest on Beneficial Loans) (No. 2) Order 1987 SI 1987/886
Inheritance Tax and Capital Transfer Tax (Interest on Unpaid Tax) Order 1987 SI 1987/887
Stamp Duty Reserve Tax (Interest on Tax Repaid) (No. 2) Order 1987 SI 1987/888
Acquisition of Land (Rate of Interest after Entry) (No. 2) Regulations 1987 SI 1987/889
Acquisition of Land (Rate of Interest after Entry) (Scotland) (No. 2) Regulations 1987 SI 1987/890
Building Societies Appeal Tribunal Regulations 1987 SI 1987/891
Estate Duty (Interest on Unpaid Duty) Order 1987 SI 1987/892
Estate Duty (Northern Ireland) (Interest on Unpaid Duty) Order 1987 SI 1987/893
Legal Aid (Scotland) (Fees in Civil Proceedings) Amendment (No.2) Regulations 1987 SI 1987/894
Civil Legal Aid (Scotland) (Fees) Amendment (No.2) Regulations 1987 SI 1987/895
Industrial Training Levy (Hotel and Catering) Order 1987 SI 1987/896
Greenwich (Prescribed Routes) (No.5) Traffic Order 1973 (Variation) Order 1987 SI 1987/897
Income Tax (Interest on Unpaid Tax and Repayment Supplement) (No. 2) Order 1987 SI 1987/898
Returning Officers' Expenses Regulations 1987 SI 1987/899
Returning Officers' Expenses (Northern Ireland) Regulations 1987 SI 1987/900

901–1000
Meters (Determination of Questions) (Expenses) Regulations 1987 SI 1987/901
Crown Prosecution Service (Witnesses' Allowances) (Amendment No.4) Regulations 1987 SI 1987/902
Representation of the People (Variation of Limits of Candidates' Election Expenses) Order 1987 SI 1987/903
Artificial Insemination of Cattle (Advertising Controls etc.) (Great Britain) Regulations 1987 SI 1987/904
Marek's Disease (Restriction on Vaccination) Order 1987 SI 1987/905
Food Protection (Emergency Prohibitions) (England) (No. 2) Amendment No. 3 Order 1987 SI 1987/906
Financial Services Act 1986 (Commencement) (No. 5) Order 1987 SI 1987/907
Milk (Cessation of Production) (England and Wales) Scheme 1987 SI 1987/908
Milk (Community Outgoers Scheme) (England and Wales) (Amendment) (No.2) Regulations 1987 SI 1987/909
Medicines (Products Other Than Veterinary Drugs) (General Sale List) Amendment Order 1987 SI 1987/910
Disabled Persons (Services, Consultation and Representation) Act 1986 (Commencement No. 3) (Scotland) Order 1987 SI 1987/911
National Library of Wales (Delivery of Books) (Amendment) Regulations 1987 SI 1987/918
New Valuation Lists Order 1987 Approved by both Houses of Parliament SI 1987/921
Black Country Development Corporation (Area and Constitution) Order 1987 SI 1987/922
Teesside Development Corporation (Area and Constitution) Order 1987 SI 1987/923
Tyne and Wear Development Corporation (Area and Constitution) Order 1987 SI 1987/924
Financial Services (Transfer of Functions Relating to Friendly Societies) Order 1987 SI 1987/925
European Communities (Designation) (No.2) Order 1987 SI 1987/926
International Headquarters and Defence Organisations (Designation and Privileges) (Amendment) Order 1987 SI 1987/927
Visiting Forces and International Headquarters (Application of Law) (Amendment) Order 1987 SI 1987/928
Race Relations (Offshore Employment) Order 1987 SI 1987/929
Sex Discrimination and Equal Pay (Offshore Employment) Order 1987 SI 1987/930
Carriage of Passengers and their Luggage by Sea (Parties to Convention) Order 1987 SI 1987/931
Merchant Shipping (Confirmation of Legislation) (Anguilla) Order 1987 SI 1987/932
Merchant Shipping (Confirmation of Legislation) (Gibraltar) Order 1987 SI 1987/933
Turks and Caicos Islands (Constitution) (Interim Amendment) Order 1987 SI 1987/934
Social Security (Australia) Order 1987 SI 1987/935
Industrial Relations (Northern Ireland) Order 1987 SI 1987/936
Parliamentary Constituencies (England) (Miscellaneous Changes) (No.2) Order 1987 SI 1987/937
Police (Northern Ireland) Order 1986 SI 1987/938
Registration of Title Order 1987 SI 1987/939
Copyright (Singapore) Order 1987 SI 1987/940
Lord Chancellor's Salary Order 1987 SI 1987/941
Financial Services Act 1986 (Delegation) Order 1987 SI 1987/942
Definition of Capital Expenses (Scotland) Order 1987 SI 1987/943
Nurses, Midwives and Health Visitors (Temporary Registration) Amendment Rules Approval Order 1987 SI 1987/944
Essex County Council (Maldon Bypass) (Blackwater Canal Bridge) Scheme 1986 Confirmation Instrument 1987 SI 1987/945
Essex County Council (Maldon Bypass) (Chelmer Viaduct Scheme 1986 Confirmation Instrument 1987 SI 1987/946
Essex County Council (Maldon Bypass) (Whiteladies Canal Bridge) Scheme 1986 Confirmation Instrument 1987 SI 1987/947
Tendring Hundred Water (Stoke-by-Nayland Boreholes) Order 1987 SI 1987/948
Sheep and Goats (Removal to Northern Ireland) (Amendment) Regulations 1987 SI 1987/949
North Norfolk (Extension and Amendment) Light Railway Order 1987 SI 1987/950
Trade Marks and Service Marks (Fees) (Amendment) Rules 1987 SI 1987/964
Customs Duties (ECSC) (No. 2) (Amendment No. 6) Order 1987 SI 1987/973
Offshore Installations (Safety Zones) (No. 31) Order 1987 SI 1987/974
Offshore Installations (Safety Zones) (No. 32) Order 1987 SI 1987/975
Offshore Installations (Safety Zones) (No. 33) Order 1987 SI 1987/976
Offshore Installations (Safety Zones) (No. 34) Order 1987 SI 1987/977
Offshore Installations (Safety Zones) (No. 35) Order 1987 SI 1987/978
Offshore Installations (Safety Zones) (No. 36) Order 1987 SI 1987/979
Offshore Installations (Safety Zones) (No. 37) Order 1987 SI 1987/980
Offshore Installations (Safety Zones) (No. 38) Order 1987 SI 1987/981
Offshore Installations (Safety Zones) (No. 39) Order 1987 SI 1987/982
Offshore Installations (Safety Zones) (No. 40) Order 1987 SI 1987/983
Offshore Installations (Safety Zones) (No. 41) Order 1987 SI 1987/984
Offshore Installations (Safety Zones) (No. 42) Order 1987 SI 1987/985
Offshore Installations (Safety Zones) (No. 43) Order 1987 SI 1987/986
Offshore Installations (Safety Zones) (No. 44) Order 1987 SI 1987/987
Offshore Installations (Safety Zones) (No. 45) Order 1987 SI 1987/988
Offshore Installations (Safety Zones) (Revocation) (No. 4) Order 1987 SI 1987/989
North of Newcastle-under-Lyme—Tarvin Trunk Road (A51 Diversion North of Hurleston) Order 1987 SI 1987/990
A41 Trunk Road (Edgware Way, Barnet) (Prescribed Routes) Order 1987 SI 1987/998
London Cab Order 1987 SI 1987/999

1001–1100
London—Great Yarmouth Trunk Road A12 (Saxmundham Bypass, Suffolk) Order 1987 SI 1987/1013
Scottish Transport Group (Scalasaig Pier) Harbour Revision Order 1987 SI 1987/1016
Diplomatic and Consular Premises Act 1987 (Commencement No.1) Order 1987 SI 1987/1022
A52 Nottingham–West of Grantham Trunk Road (Bottesford Bypass) Order 1987 SI 1987/1025
A52 Nottingham—West of Grantham Trunk Road (Bottesford Bypass) Detrunking Order 1987 SI 1987/1026
Foreign Compensation (Financial Provisions) (No.2) Order 1987 SI 1987/1028
Arbitration (Foreign Awards) Order 1987 SI 1987/1029
Copyright (Singapore) (Amendment) Order 1987 SI 1987/1030
Lothian Regional Council (Megget Reservoir etc.) (Amendment) Water Order 1987 SI 1987/1032
London—Holyhead Trunk Road A5 (Chirk By-pass) Order 1987 SI 1987/1037
London-Holyhead Trunk Road A5 (Rhoswiel–Whitehurst Detrunking) Order 1987 SI 1987/1038
A41 Trunk Road (Watford Way, Barnet) (Prescribed Routes) Order 1987 SI 1987/1048
Customs Duties (ECSC) (No. 2) (Amendment No.7) Order 1987 SI 1987/1053
Northumbrian Water Authority (T Nets) (Southern Area) Order 1987 SI 1987/1054
M40 London—Oxford—Birmingham Motorway (Waterstock to Warwick Section) and Connecting Roads (No 1) Scheme 1984 Variation Scheme 1987 SI 1987/1057
Criminal Justice Act 1987 (Commencement No. 1) Order 1987 SI 1987/1061
Police Federation (Amendment) Regulations 1987 SI 1987/1062
International Carriage of Perishable Foodstuffs (Amendment) Regulations 1987 SI 1987/1066
A41(M) Watford-Tring Motorway and Connecting Roads (Tring Bypass Section) (Partial Revocation) Scheme 1987 SI 1987/1070
Value Added Tax (Construction of Buildings) (No. 2) Order 1987 SI 1987/1072
Local Government Reorganisation (Property) (West Midlands) Order 1987 SI 1987/1077
Act of Sederunt (Shorthand Writers' Fees) 1987 SI 1987/1078
Act of Sederunt (Rules of Court Amendment No.3) (Shorthand Writers' Fees) 1987 SI 1987/1079
Yorkshire Dales Light Railway Order 1987 SI 1987/1088
Cereal Seeds (Amendment) Regulations 1987 SI 1987/1091
Fodder Plant Seeds (Amendment) Regulations 1987 SI 1987/1092
Vegetable Seeds (Amendment) Regulations 1987 SI 1987/1093
Offshore Installations (Safety Zones) (No. 46) Order 1987 SI 1987/1094
Offshore Installations (Safety Zones) (No. 47) Order 1987 SI 1987/1095
Social Security Act 1986 (Commencement No.7) Order 1987 SI 1987/1096
Oil and Fibre Plant Seeds (Amendment) Regulations 1987 SI 1987/1097
Seeds (Registration, Licensing and Enforcement) (Amendment) Regulations 1987 SI 1987/1098
Contracting-out (Transfer) Amendment Regulations 1987 SI 1987/1099
Contracting-out (Widowers' Guaranteed Minimum Pensions) Regulations 1987 SI 1987/1100

1101–1200
Money Purchase Contracted-out Schemes Regulations 1987 SI 1987/1101
Occupational Pension Schemes (Auditors) Regulations 1987 SI 1987/1102
Occupational Pension Schemes (Contracted-out Protected Rights Premiums) Regulations 1987 SI 1987/1103
Occupational Pension Schemes (Contracting-out) Amendment Regulations 1987 SI 1987/1104
Occupational Pension Schemes (Disclosure of Information) (Amendment) Regulations 1987 SI 1987/1105
Occupational Pension Schemes (Qualifying Service—Consequential and Other Provisions) Regulations 1987 SI 1987/1106
Occupational Pension Schemes (Transfer Values) Amendment Regulations 1987 SI 1987/1107
Pension Schemes (Voluntary Contributions Requirements and Voluntary and Compulsory Membership) Regulations 1987 SI 1987/1108
Personal Pension Schemes (Appropriate Schemes) Regulations 1987 SI 1987/1109
Personal Pension Schemes (Disclosure of Information) Regulations 1987 SI 1987/1110
Personal Pension Schemes (Personal Pension Protected Rights Premiums) Regulations 1987 SI 1987/1111
Personal Pension Schemes (Transfer Values) Regulations 1987 SI 1987/1112
Personal and Occupational Pension Schemes (Abatement of Benefit) Regulations 1987 SI 1987/1113
Personal and Occupational Pension Schemes (Consequential Provisions) Regulations 1987 SI 1987/1114
Personal and Occupational Pension Schemes (Incentive Payments) Regulations 1987 SI 1987/1115
Personal and Occupational Pension Schemes (Modification of Enactments) Regulations 1987 SI 1987/1116
Personal and Occupational Pension Schemes (Protected Rights) Regulations 1987 SI 1987/1117
Protected Rights (Transfer Payment) Regulations 1987 SI 1987/1118
County Court (Forms) (Amendment) Rules 1987 SI 1987/1119
General Medical Council (Constitution of Fitness to Practise Committees) (Amendment) Rules Order of Council 1987 SI 1987/1120
Customs Duties (Quota Relief) Order 1987 SI 1987/1122
Medicines (Exemptions from Restrictions on the Retail Sale or Supply of Veterinary Drugs) (Amendment) Order 1987 SI 1987/1123
Employment Subsidies Act 1978 (Renewal) (Great Britain) Order 1987 SI 1987/1124
Customs Duties (ECSC) (No. 2) (Amendment No. 8) Order 1987 SI 1987/1125
Education (Grant) (Amendment) Regulations 1987 SI 1987/1126
Inheritance Tax (Delivery of Accounts) Regulations 1987 SI 1987/1127
Inheritance Tax (Delivery of Accounts) (Scotland) Regulations 1987 SI 1987/1128
Inheritance Tax (Delivery of Accounts) (Northern Ireland) Regulations 1987 SI 1987/1129
Inheritance Tax (Double Charges Relief) Regulations 1987 SI 1987/1130
Restriction on Agreements and Conduct (Tour Operators) Order 1987 SI 1987/1131
London City Airport Byelaws (Designation) Order 1987 SI 1987/1132
Road Vehicles (Construction and Use) (Amendment) (No.2) Regulations 1987 SI 1987/1133
Fish Farming (Financial Assistance) Scheme 1987 SI 1987/1134
Fishing Vessels (Acquisition and Improvement) (Grants) Scheme 1987 SI 1987/1135
Fishing Vessels (Financial Assistance) Scheme 1987 SI 1987/1136
Justices of the Peace (Size and Chairmanship of Bench) (Amendment) Rules 1987 SI 1987/1137
Education (Grants) (City Technology Colleges) Regulations 1987 SI 1987/1138
Lands Tribunal for Scotland (Amendment) (Fees) Rules 1987 SI 1987/1139
Education (Abolition of Corporal Punishment: Prescription of Schools) (Scotland) Order 1987 SI 1987/1140
Financial Services (Disclosure of Information) (Designated Authorities) (No.3) Order 1987 SI 1987/1141
Video Recordings Act 1984 (Commencement No. 5) Order 1987 SI 1987/1142
London Pilotage (Amendment) Order 1987 SI 1987/1143
Motor Vehicles (Tests) (Amendment) Regulations 1987 SI 1987/1144
Rules of the Air and Air Traffic Control (Third Amendment) Regulations 1987 SI 1987/1145
St Mary's Music School (Aided Places) Amendment Regulations 1987 SI 1987/1146
Education (Assisted Places) (Scotland) Amendment Regulations 1987 SI 1987/1147
Seeds (Fees) (Amendment) Regulations 1987 SI 1987/1148
Goods Vehicles (Prohibitions) (Exemptions and Appeals) Regulations 1987 SI 1987/1149
Public Passenger Vehicles (Exemptions, and Appeals against Refusals to Issue Certificates or Remove Prohibitions) Regulations 1987 SI 1987/1150
Further Education (Recoupment) Regulations 1987 SI 1987/1158
Education (No. 2) Act 1986 (Commencement No. 3) Order 1987 SI 1987/1159
Education (Governing Bodies of Institutions of Further Education) Regulations 1987 SI 1987/1160
Easington Lagoons (Area of Special Protection) Order 1987 SI 1987/1163
Assured Tenancies (Approved Bodies) (No. 3) Order 1987 SI 1987/1164
Food Protection (Emergency Prohibitions) Order 1987 SI 1987/1165
Non-Contentious Probate Fees (Amendment) Order 1987 SI 1987/1176
Recognition of Trusts Act 1987 (Commencement) Order 1987 SI 1987/1177
Food Protection (Emergency Prohibitions) (Wales) Order 1987 SI 1987/1181
Direct Grant Schools (Amendment) Regulations 1987 SI 1987/1182
Education (Abolition of Corporal Punishment) (Independent Schools) Regulations 1987 SI 1987/1183
Eggs (Marketing Standards) (Amendment) Regulations 1987 SI 1987/1184
Banking Act 1987 (Commencement No. 1) Order 1987 SI 1987/1189
Home-Grown Cereals Authority (Rate of Levy) Order 1987 SI 1987/1194
Blood Tests (Evidence of Paternity) (Amendment) Regulations 1987 SI 1987/1199
Gaming (Amendment) Act 1987 (Commencement) Order 1987 SI 1987/1200

1201–1300
Petty Sessional Divisions (Gwynedd) Order 1987 SI 1987/1201
Home Purchase Assistance (Recognised Lending Institutions) Order 1987 SI 1987/1202
Housing (Right to Buy) (Priority of Charges) Order 1987 SI 1987/1203
Mortgage Indemnities (Recognised Bodies) Order 1987 SI 1987/1204
Carlisle—Sunderland Trunk Road (A69) (Brampton Bypass) Order 1987 SI 1987/1205
Act of Sederunt (Rules of Court Amendment No.4) (Miscellaneous) 1987 SI 1987/1206
Northern Ireland Act 1974 (Interim Period Extension) Order 1987 SI 1987/1207
Heather and Grass etc. (Burning) (Amendment) Regulations 1987 SI 1987/1208
Prevention of Terrorism (Supplemental Temporary Provisions) (Amendment No. 2) Order 1987 SI 1987/1209
Customs Duties (ECSC) (No. 2) (Amendment No. 9) Order 1987 SI 1987/1218
Income Tax (Interest Relief) (Qualifying Lenders) Order 1987 SI 1987/1224
Coal Industry Social Welfare Organisation (Amendment of Memorandum and Articles) Order 1987 SI 1987/1225
Mineworkers' Pension Scheme Order 1987 SI 1987/1226
Plaice and Saithe (Specified Sea Areas) (Prohibition of Fishing) Order 1987 SI 1987/1227
Transport Act 1985 (Commencement No.7) Order 1987 SI 1987/1228
Section 19 Minibus (Designated Bodies) Order 1987 SI 1987/1229
Minibus and Other Section 19 Permit Buses Regulations 1987 SI 1987/1230
Building Standards (Scotland) Amendment Regulations 1987 SI 1987/1231
Building (Procedure) (Scotland) Amendment Regulations 1987 SI 1987/1232
Thames Water Authority (Amendment of Local Enactments) Order 1987 SI 1987/1233
Yorkshire Water Authority (Howe Bridge Boreholes) Order 1987 SI 1987/1234
Yorkshire Water Authority (Catterick Boreholes) Order 1987 SI 1987/1235
Yorkshire Water Authority (Cayton Borehole) Order 1987 SI 1987/1236
Yorkshire Water Authority (Studforth Boreholes) Order 1987 SI 1987/1237
Urban Development Corporations (Financial Limits) Order 1987 SI 1987/1238
Northern Ireland (Emergency Provisions) Act 1987 (Commencement No.1) Order 1987 SI 1987/1241
Children Act 1975 and the Adoption Act 1976 (Commencement No. 2) Order 1987 SI 1987/1242
Video Recordings Act 1984 (Scotland) (Commencement No.5) Order 1987 SI 1987/1249
Medicines (Products Other Than Veterinary Drugs) (Prescription Only) Amendment (No. 2) Order 1987 SI 1987/1250
Rate Limitation (Designation of Authorities) (Exemption) (Wales) (No. 2) Order 1987 SI 1987/1251
Asian Development Bank (Fourth Replenishment of the Asian Development Fund) Order 1987 SI 1987/1252
Commonwealth Development Corporation (Additional Enterprises) Order 1987 SI 1987/1253
Chevening Estate Act 1987 (Commencement) Order 1987 SI 1987/1254
Detention Centre (Amendment) Rules 1987 SI 1987/1255
Prison (Amendment) Rules 1987 SI 1987/1256
Youth Custody Centre (Amendment) Rules 1987 SI 1987/1257
Redundant Mineworkers and Concessionary Coal (Payments Schemes) (Amendment) Order 1987 SI 1987/1258
Value Added Tax (Education) Order 1987 SI 1987/1259
Reverter of Sites Act 1987 (Commencement) Order 1987 SI 1987/1260
Education (Mandatory Awards) Regulations 1987 SI 1987/1261
Army, Air Force and Naval Discipline Acts (Continuation) Order 1987 SI 1987/1262
Admiralty Jurisdiction (Gibraltar) Order 1987 SI 1987/1263
Consular Fees Order 1987 SI 1987/1264
Continental Shelf (Designated Areas) (Extended Territorial Sea) Order 1987 SI 1987/1265
Evidence (Proceedings in Other Jurisdictions) (Turks and Caicos Islands) Order 1987 SI 1987/1266
Merchant Shipping (Confirmation of Legislation) (Cayman Islands) Order 1987 SI 1987/1267
St. Helena (Constitution) (Amendment) Order 1987 SI 1987/1268
Territorial Sea (Limits) Order 1987 SI 1987/1269
Territorial Sea Act 1987 (Commencement) Order 1987 SI 1987/1270
Turks and Caicos Islands (Constitution) (Interim Amendment) (No. 2) Order 1987 SI 1987/1271
Health Service Commissioner for England (Disablement Services Authority) Order 1987 SI 1987/1272
Alderney (Transfer of Property etc.) Order 1987 SI 1987/1273
Appropriation (No. 2) (Northern Ireland) Order 1987 SI 1987/1274
Electricity Supply (Amendment) (Northern Ireland) Order 1987 SI 1987/1275
Friendly Societies Act 1984 (Jersey) Order 1987 SI 1987/1276
Licensing (Northern Ireland) Order 1987 SI 1987/1277
Registration of Clubs (Northern Ireland) Order 1987 SI 1987/1278
Methodist Church Act 1976 (Guernsey) Order 1987 SI 1987/1279
Occupiers' Liability (Northern Ireland) Order 1987 SI 1987/1280
Protection of Military Remains Act 1986 (Guernsey) Order 1987 SI 1987/1281
Reciprocal Enforcement of Maintenance Orders (Hague Convention Countries) (Variation) Order 1987 SI 1987/1282
Jury Trial (Amendment) (Northern Ireland) Order 1987 SI 1987/1283
Merchant Shipping (Fishing Boats Registry) (Amendment) Order 1987 SI 1987/1284
Pupils' Registration (Amendment) Regulations 1987 SI 1987/1285
Local Government Reorganisation (Property) (Tyne and Wear) Order 1987 SI 1987/1288
Banking Act 1987 (Disclosure of Information) (Specified Persons) Order 1987 SI 1987/1292
Stock Transfer (Gilt-edged Securities) (CGO Service) (Amendment) Regulations 1987 SI 1987/1293
Stock Transfer (Gilt-edged Securities) (Exempt Transfer) Regulations 1987 SI 1987/1294
Legal Officers (Annual Fees) Order 1987 SI 1987/1296
Ecclesiastical Judges and Legal Officers (Fees) Order 1987 SI 1987/1297
Merchant Shipping (Closing of Openings in Hulls and in Watertight Bulkheads) Regulations 1987 SI 1987/1298
Banking Appeal Tribunal Regulations 1987 SI 1987/1299

1301–1400
Firemen's Pension Scheme (Amendment) Order 1987 SI 1987/1302
Meat and Livestock Commission Levy Scheme (Confirmation) Order 1987 SI 1987/1303
Data Protection (Fees) (No. 2) Regulations 1987 SI 1987/1304
Pensioners' Lump Sum Payments Order 1987 SI 1987/1305
Pilotage Act 1987 (Commencement No. 1) Order 1987 SI 1987/1306
Parliamentary and other Pensions Act 1987 (Commencement No.1) Order 1987 SI 1987/1311
Education (Assisted Places) (Amendment) Regulations 1987 SI 1987/1312
Education (Assisted Places) (Incidental Expenses) (Amendment) Regulations 1987 SI 1987/1313
Education (Grants) (Music and Ballet Schools) (Amendment) Regulations 1987 SI 1987/1314
Road Vehicles Lighting (Amendment) Regulations 1987 SI 1987/1315
Severn-Trent Water Authority (Wallgrange Boreholes) Order 1987 SI 1987/1322
Supplementary Benefit (Requirements and Resources) Amendment Regulations 1987 SI 1987/1325
Road Vehicles (Marking of Special Weights) (Amendment) Regulations 1987 SI 1987/1326
Motor Vehicles (Authorisation of Special Types) (Amendment) Order 1987 SI 1987/1327
Act of Adjournal (Service of Documents on Accused Persons) 1987 SI 1987/1328
Rate Support Grant (Scotland) (No.2) Order 1987 SI 1987/1329
Petroleum Act 1987 (Commencement No. 2) Order 1987 SI 1987/1330
Offshore Installations (Safety Zones) Regulations 1987 SI 1987/1331
Offshore Installations (Safety Zones) (No. 48) Order 1987 SI 1987/1332
(A65) Liverpool-Preston-Leeds Trunk Road (Addingham Bypass) Order 1987 SI 1987/1333
(A65) Liverpool—Preston—Leeds Trunk Road (Heathness Gill to Lumb Gill Lane) (Detrunking) Order 1987 SI 1987/1334
Further Education Act 1985 (Commencement No.2) (Scotland) Order 1987 SI 1987/1335
Banking Appeal Tribunal (Scottish Appeals) Regulations 1987 SI 1987/1336
Bunk Beds (Entrapment Hazards) (Safety) Regulations 1987 SI 1987/1337
Petroleum Revenue Tax (Nomination Scheme for Disposals and Appropriations) Regulations 1987 SI 1987/1338
Job Release Act 1977 (Continuation) Order 1987 SI 1987/1339
Black Country Development Corporation (Planning Functions) Order 1987 SI 1987/1340
Teesside Development Corporation (Planning Functions) Order 1987 SI 1987/1341
Tyne and Wear Development Corporation (Planning Functions) Order 1987 SI 1987/1342
Town and Country Planning (Black Country Urban Development Area) Special Development Order 1987 SI 1987/1343
Town and Country Planning (Teesside Urban Development Area) Special Development Order 1987 SI 1987/1344
Town and Country Planning (Tyne and Wear Urban Development Area) Special Development Order 1987 SI 1987/1345
Building Societies Investor Protection Scheme (Maximum Protected Investment) Order 1987 SI 1987/1349
Export of Goods (Control) (Amendment No. 10) Order 1987 SI 1987/1350
(A168) Boroughbridge-Thirsk Trunk Road (Dishforth Interchange, Slip Roads and Link Roads) Order 1987 SI 1987/1353
Wessex Water Authority (Blashford Lakes Discharge) Order 1987 SI 1987/1354
Legal Advice and Assistance (Scotland) Amendment Regulations 1987 SI 1987/1355
Advice and Assistance (Scotland) Amendment (No.2) Regulations 1987 SI 1987/1356
Legal Aid (Scotland) (Fees in Criminal Proceedings) Amendment (No.2) Regulations 1987 SI 1987/1357
Criminal Legal Aid (Scotland) (Fees) Amendment (No.2) Regulations 1987 SI 1987/1358
Education (School Government) Regulations 1987 SI 1987/1359
Thames Water Authority (Transfer of Property of Dartford and Crayford Navigation Commissioners) Order 1987 SI 1987/1360
Education (Fees and Awards) (Amendment) Regulations 1987 SI 1987/1364
State Awards (Amendment) Regulations 1987 SI 1987/1365
Education Authority Bursaries (Scotland) Amendment Regulations 1987 SI 1987/1366
M3 Motorway (Compton—Bassett Section) Scheme 1987 SI 1987/1367
M3 Motorway (Compton—Bassett Section) Connecting Roads Scheme 1987 SI 1987/1368
M3 Motorway (Compton-Bassett Section) (Revocation) Scheme 1987 SI 1987/1369
M3 Motorway (Compton-Bassett Section) (Revocation) (No.2) Scheme 1987 SI 1987/1370
M3 Motorway (Hockley—Compton Section) (Revocation) Scheme 1987 SI 1987/1371
M3 Motorway (Popham—Hockley Section) (Variation) Scheme 1987 SI 1987/1372
Aerodromes (Designation) (Detention and Sale of Aircraft) Order 1987 SI 1987/1377
Motor Vehicles (Driving Licences) Regulations 1987 SI 1987/1378
Grants by Local Housing Authorities (Appropriate Percentage and Exchequer Contributions) Order 1987 SI 1987/1379
A406 Trunk Road (Angel Road, Enfield) (Prescribed Routes) Order 1987 SI 1987/1380
Local Authorities (Allowances) (Scotland) Amendment Regulations 1987 SI 1987/1381
National Health Service (General Medical and Pharmaceutical Services) (Scotland) Amendment (No.3) Regulations 1987 SI 1987/1382
Education (Fees and Awards) (Scotland) Amendment Regulations 1987 SI 1987/1383
Local Authorities (Recognised Bodies for Heritable Securities Indemnities) (Scotland) Order 1987 SI 1987/1388
Housing Corporation (Recognised Bodies for Heritable Securities Indemnities) (Scotland) Order 1987 SI 1987/1389
Highland Regional Council (Abhainn Greadhain, Glenachulish) Water Order 1987 SI 1987/1390
Highland Regional Council (Forest Spring, Storr, Skye) Water Order 1987 SI 1987/1391
Highland Regional Council (Allt Sanna, West Ardnamurchan) Water Order 1987 SI 1987/1392
Education (Bursaries for Teacher Training) (Amendment) (No. 2) Regulations 1987 SI 1987/1393
Smoke Control Areas (Exempted Fireplaces) Order 1987 SI 1987/1394
County Court (Amendment No.2) Rules 1987 SI 1987/1397
Insolvency (Amendment of Subordinate Legislation) Order 1987 SI 1987/1398
Offshore Installations (Safety Zones) (Revocation) (No. 5) Order 1987 SI 1987/1399
Offshore Installations (Safety Zones) (No. 49) Order 1987 SI 1987/1400

1401–1500
Offshore Installations (Safety Zones) (No. 50) Order 1987 SI 1987/1401
Offshore Installations (Safety Zones) (No. 51) Order 1987 SI 1987/1402
Offshore Installations (Safety Zones) (No. 52) Order 1987 SI 1987/1403
Offshore Installations (Safety Zones) (No. 53) Order 1987 SI 1987/1404
Offshore Installations (Safety Zones) (No. 54) Order 1987 SI 1987/1405
Offshore Installations (Safety Zones) (No. 55) Order 1987 SI 1987/1406
Offshore Installations (Safety Zones) (No. 56) Order 1987 SI 1987/1407
Offshore Installations (Safety Zones) (No. 57) Order 1987 SI 1987/1408
Offshore Installations (Safety Zones) (No. 58) Order 1987 SI 1987/1409
Offshore Installations (Safety Zones) (No. 59) Order 1987 SI 1987/1410
Offshore Installations (Safety Zones) (No. 60) Order 1987 SI 1987/1411
Offshore Installations (Safety Zones) (No. 61) Order 1987 SI 1987/1412
Offshore Installations (Safety Zones) (No. 62) Order 1987 SI 1987/1413
Offshore Installations (Safety Zones) (No. 63) Order 1987 SI 1987/1414
Offshore Installations (Safety Zones) (No. 64) Order 1987 SI 1987/1415
Offshore Installations (Safety Zones) (No. 65) Order 1987 SI 1987/1416
Offshore Installations (Safety Zones) (No. 66) Order 1987 SI 1987/1417
Offshore Installations (Safety Zones) (No. 67) Order 1987 SI 1987/1418
Offshore Installations (Safety Zones) (No. 68) Order 1987 SI 1987/1419
Offshore Installations (Safety Zones) (No. 69) Order 1987 SI 1987/1420
Drivers' Hours (Goods Vehicles) (Keeping of Records) Regulations 1987 SI 1987/1421
Revenue Appeals Order 1987 SI 1987/1422
Rules of the Supreme Court (Amendment) 1987 SI 1987/1423
Social Security (Adjudication) Amendment Regulations 1987 SI 1987/1424
National Health Service (General Medical and Pharmaceutical Services) Amendment (No. 4) Regulations 1987 SI 1987/1425
Social Security (Attendance Allowance) Amendment Regulations 1987 SI 1987/1426
Value Added Tax (Cash Accounting) Regulations 1987 SI 1987/1427
National Health Service (Transferred Staff—Appeals Amendment) Order 1987 SI 1987/1428
M20 Motorway (Maidstone East Interchange) Connecting Roads Scheme 1987 SI 1987/1429
Folkestone-Honiton Trunk Road (Dittons-Pevensey Section De-Trunking) Order 1987 SI 1987/1430
Folkestone—Honiton Trunk Road (A27 Pevensey Bypass and Slip Road) Order 1987 SI 1987/1431
A4 Trunk Road (Great West Road, Hounslow) (Prescribed Routes) Order 1987 SI 1987/1432
Education (School Teachers' Pay and Conditions) Order 1987 SI 1987/1433
East Surrey Water Order 1987 SI 1987/1434
Hungerford—Hereford Trunk Road (A419) (Stratton St Margaret Bypass Slip Roads) Order 1987 SI 1987/1435
Food Protection (Emergency Prohibitions) (Wales) (No.2) Order 1987 SI 1987/1436
Medicines (Fees) Amendment Regulations 1987 SI 1987/1439
Housing Benefits (Amendment) Regulations 1987 SI 1987/1440
Knowsley Metropolitan Borough Council (M57 Motorway Associated Special Roads) (Huyton Spur) Revocation Scheme 1987 Confirmation Instrument 1987 SI 1987/1441
West of Southampton-Bath Trunk Road A36 (Steeple Langford Bypass) Order 1987 SI 1987/1442
Swanage Light Railway Order 1987 SI 1987/1443
Building (Disabled People) Regulations 1987 SI 1987/1445
Local Government Reorganisation (Property) (Greater Manchester) Order 1987 SI 1987/1446
Diseases of Animals (Approved Disinfectants) (Amendment) (No. 2) Order 1987 SI 1987/1447
Food Protection (Emergency Prohibitions) (No.2) Order 1987 SI 1987/1450
Local Government Reorganisation (Property) (West Yorkshire) (No. 2) Order 1987 SI 1987/1451
Royal Irish Constabulary (Lump Sum Payments to Widows) Regulations 1987 SI 1987/1461
Police Pensions (Lump Sum Payments to Widows) Regulations 1987 SI 1987/1462
Local Government Reorganisation (Property, etc.) (Merseyside) Order 1987 SI 1987/1463
Crown Office Fees Order 1987 SI 1987/1464
Agricultural Holdings (Units of Production) Order 1987 SI 1987/1465
Criminal Justice (Scotland) Act 1987 (Commencement No.1) Order 1987 SI 1987/1468
Swansea-Manchester Trunk Road A483 (Improvement at Boundary Terrace Llandrindod Wells) Order 1987 SI 1987/1470
Local Government (Allowances) (Amendment) Regulations 1987 SI 1987/1483
Lowestoft Pilotage (Amendment) Order 1987 SI 1987/1484
Abolition of Domestic Rates Etc. (Scotland) Act 1987 Commencement Order 1987 SI 1987/1489
A65 Skipton—Kendal Trunk Road (Whoop Hall Diversion) Order 1987 SI 1987/1491
Income Tax (Interest on Unpaid Tax and Repayment Supplement) (No. 3) Order 1987 SI 1987/1492
Income Tax (Official Rate of Interest on Beneficial Loans) (No. 3) Order 1987 SI 1987/1493
Stamp Duty Reserve Tax (Interest on Tax Repaid) (No. 3) Order 1987 SI 1987/1494
Insurance Brokers Registration Council (Indemnity Insurance and Grants Scheme) Rules Approval Order 1987 SI 1987/1496
Semiconductor Products (Protection of Topography) Regulations 1987 SI 1987/1497
Building Societies (Isle of Man) Order 1987 SI 1987/1498
Building Societies (Liquid Asset) Regulations 1987 SI 1987/1499
Building Societies (Prescribed Contracts) (Amendment) Order 1987 SI 1987/1500

1501–1600
Data Protection (Subject Access) (Fees) Regulations 1987 SI 1987/1507
Motor Vehicles (Type Approval for Goods Vehicles) (Great Britain) (Amendment) Regulations 1987 SI 1987/1508
Motor Vehicles (Type Approval) (Great Britain) (Amendment) Regulations 1987 SI 1987/1509
National Health Service (General Dental Services) Amendment (No. 2) Regulations 1987 SI 1987/1512
Occupational Pension Schemes (Maximum Rate Lump Sum) Regulations 1987 SI 1987/1513
Warkworth Harbour Revision Order 1987 SI 1987/1514
Food Protection (Emergency Prohibitions) (Wales) (No.3) Order 1987 SI 1987/1515
Sports Grounds and Sporting Events (Designation) (Amendment) Order 1987 SI 1987/1520
Counterfeit Goods (Consequential Provisions) Regulations 1987 SI 1987/1521
Town and Country Planning Appeals (Determination by Appointed Person) (Inquiries Procedure) (Scotland) Amendment Rules 1987 SI 1987/1522
Materials and Articles in Contact with Food Regulations 1987 SI 1987/1523
Assured Tenancies (Approved Bodies) (No. 4) Order 1987 SI 1987/1525
Town and Country Planning (Listed Buildings and Buildings in Conservation Areas) (Scotland) Regulations 1987 SI 1987/1529
Strathclyde and Dumfries and Galloway Regions and Kyle and Carrick and Wigtown Districts (Lagafater Lodge and Shennas Lodge, New Luce) Boundaries Amendment Order 1987 SI 1987/1530 (S. 113)
Town and Country Planning (Determination of Appeals by Appointed Persons) (Prescribed Classes) (Scotland) Regulations 1987 SI 1987/1531
Town and Country Planning (Simplified Planning Zones) (Scotland) Regulations 1987 SI 1987/1532
Recreation Grounds (Revocation of Parish Council Byelaws) Order 1987 SI 1987/1533
Industrial Training Levy (Clothing and Allied Products) Order 1987 SI 1987/1534
London Taxi Sharing Scheme Order 1987 SI 1987/1535
Sea Fishing (Enforcement of Community Control Measures) (Amendment) Order 1987 SI 1987/1536
Police (Common Police Services) (Scotland) Order 1987 SI 1987/1537
Weights and Measures (Quantity Marking and Abbreviations of Units) Regulations 1987 SI 1987/1538
A20 Trunk Road (Sidcup Bypass, Bexley and Bromley) (Prescribed Routes) Order 1987 SI 1987/1542
Food Protection (Emergency Prohibitions) (Wales)(No. 3) Amendment Order 1987 SI 1987/1553
Housing and Planning Act 1986 (Commencement No. 6) Order 1987 SI 1987/1554
Food Protection (Emergency Prohibitions) (England) (No. 2) Amendment No. 4 Order 1987 SI 1987/1555
Motor Vehicles (Type Approval and Approval Marks) (Fees) (Amendment) (No. 2) Regulations 1987 SI 1987/1556
Herring and White Fish (Specified Manx Waters) Licensing (Variation) Order 1987 SI 1987/1564
Sea Fish Licensing (Variation) Order 1987 SI 1987/1565
Sea Fishing (Specified Western Waters) (Restrictions on Landing) Order 1987 SI 1987/1566
Food Protection (Emergency Prohibitions) Amendment Order 1987 SI 1987/1567
Food Protection (Emergency Prohibitions) (No. 2) Amendment Order 1987 SI 1987/1568
Exeter—Launceston—Bodmin Trunk Road (A30) (Alder Quarry Realignment) Order 1987 SI 1987/1570
Devon (District Boundaries) Order 1987 SI 1987/1576
Consumer Credit (Exempt Agreements) (No. 2) (Amendment) Order 1987 SI 1987/1578
Local Government Reorganisation (Pensions etc.) (Greater Manchester and Merseyside) Order 1987 SI 1987/1579
London—Portsmouth Trunk Road A3 (Ham Barn—Petersfield Section) Order 1987 SI 1987/1580
London—Portsmouth Trunk Road A3 (Ham Barn—Petersfield Section Slip Roads) Order 1987 SI 1987/1581
A421 (Wendlebury to Bicester Section, Trunking) Order 1987 SI 1987/1582
Local Government (Prescribed Expenditure) (Works) Regulations 1987 SI 1987/1583
Social Security (Contributions) Amendment (No.3) Regulations 1987 SI 1987/1590
Merchant Shipping (Smooth and Partially Smooth Waters) Regulations 1987 SI 1987/1591
Criminal Justice (Scotland) Act 1987 (Commencement No. 2) Order 1987 SI 1987/1594
Hartlepools Water (Red Barns Borehole) Order 1987 SI 1987/1597
Essex (District Boundaries) Order 1987 SI 1987/1598
Welsh Water Authority (Moreton-on-Lugg) (Acquisition of Mains) Order 1987 SI 1987/1599
 The East Devon (Parishes) Order 1987 S.I. 1987/1600

1601–1700
Warble Fly (England and Wales) (Amendment) Order 1987 SI 1987/1601
Anglian Water Authority (Moor Farm Heighington) Order 1987 SI 1987/1602
Merchant Shipping (Submersible Craft Operations) (Amendment) Regulations 1987 SI 1987/1603
Housing and Planning Act 1986 (Commencement No. 7) (Scotland) Order 1987 SI 1987/1607
Enduring Powers of Attorney (Prescribed Form) Regulations 1987 SI 1987/1612
Bus Companies (Dissolution) Order 1987 SI 1987/1613
Borough of Oadby and Wigston (Electoral Arrangements) Order 1987 SI 1987/1625
Borough of Torbay (Electoral Arrangements) Order 1987 SI 1987/1626
Enduring Powers of Attorney (Northern Ireland) Order 1987 SI 1987/1627
Enduring Powers of Attorney (Northern Ireland Consequential Amendment) Order 1987 SI 1987/1628
Limitation (Amendment) (Northern Ireland) Order 1987 SI 1987/1629
London — Penzance Trunk Road A303 (Ilchester — South Petherton and Slip Roads) Order 1987 SI 1987/1632
London–Penzance Trunk Road A303 (Ilchester–South Petherton and Slip Roads) (Detrunking) Order 1987 SI 1987/1633
National Health Service (General Dental Services) (Scotland) Amendment Regulations 1987 SI 1987/1634
National Savings Stock Register (Amendment) Regulations 1987 SI 1987/1635
Crown Prosecution Service (Witnesses' Allowances) (Amendment No. 5) Regulations 1987 SI 1987/1636
Hovercraft (Fees) Regulations 1987 SI 1987/1637
Food Protection (Emergency Prohibitions) (Wales) (No. 4) Order 1987 SI 1987/1638
Gipsy Encampments (Borough of Kettering) Order 1987 SI 1987/1639
Gipsy Encampments (County of Northumberland) Order 1987 SI 1987/1640
Gipsy Encampments (District of Cherwell) Order 1987 SI 1987/1641
Wakefield (Derelict Land Clearance Area) Order 1987 SI 1987/1653
Banking Act 1987 (Commencement No. 2) Order 1987 SI 1987/1664
Building Societies (Banking Institutions) Order 1987 SI 1987/1670
Building Societies (Residential Use) Order 1987 SI 1987/1671
Import and Export (Plant Health) (Great Britain) (Amendment)(No. 2) Order 1987 SI 1987/1679
Consumer Protection Act 1987 (Commencement No. 1) Order 1987 SI 1987/1680
Consumer Safety Act 1978 (Commencement No. 3) Order 1987 SI 1987/1681
Food Protection (Emergency Prohibitions) (Wales) (No. 4) Amendment Order 1987 SI 1987/1682
Social Security (Hospital In-Patients) Amendment (No. 2) Regulations 1987 SI 1987/1683
Food Protection (Emergency Prohibitions) (England) (No. 2) Amendment No. 5 Order 1987 SI 1987/1687
Petty Sessional Divisions (Lancashire) Order 1987 SI 1987/1688
Safety of Sports Grounds (Designation) Order 1987 SI 1987/1689
Social Security (Widow's Benefit) Transitional Regulations 1987 SI 1987/1692
A6 London—Inverness Trunk Road (Kettering Southern Bypass) Order 1987 SI 1987/1693
A43 Oxford–Market Deeping Trunk Road (Kettering Northern Bypass) Order 1987 SI 1987/1694
A604 Catthorpe-Harwich Trunk Road (Kettering to Thrapston Section and Slip Roads) Order 1987 SI 1987/1695
Food Protection (Emergency Prohibitions) Amendment No.2 Order 1987 SI 1987/1696
Food Protection (Emergency Prohibitions) (No.2) Amendment No.2 Order 1987 SI 1987/1697
Special Constables (Injury Benefit) (Scotland) Regulations 1987 SI 1987/1698
Police Cadets (Pensions) (Scotland) Amendment Regulations 1987 SI 1987/1699
Police Cadets (Injury Benefit) (Scotland) Regulations 1987 SI 1987/1700

1701–1800
Exeter-Launceston-Bodmin Trunk Road A30 (Launceston to Plusha Improvement and Slip Roads) Order 1987 SI 1987/1701
Traffic Signs General (Amendment) Directions 1987 SI 1987/1706
Gipsy Encampments (Borough of Great Yarmouth) Order 1987 SI 1987/1709
Value Added Tax (Supplies by Retailers) (Amendment) Regulations 1987 SI 1987/1712
Control of Noise (Code of Practice for Construction and Open Sites) Order 1987 SI 1987/1730
A11 London—Norwich Trunk Road (Thetford Bypass) Order 1987 SI 1987/1731
Housing (Extension of Right to Buy) Order 1987 SI 1987/1732
Shropshire (District Boundaries) Order 1987 SI 1987/1737
Liquor Licensing (Fees) (Scotland) Order 1987 SI 1987/1738
Petty Sessional Divisions (Dorset) Order 1987 SI 1987/1739
Occupational Pension Schemes (Additional Voluntary Contributions) Regulations 1987 SI 1987/1749
Town and Country Planning (Simplified Planning Zones) Regulations 1987 SI 1987/1750
Police (Amendment) Regulations 1987 SI 1987/1753
Police Cadets (Amendment) Regulations 1987 SI 1987/1754
Road Transport (International Passenger Services) (Amendment) Regulations 1987 SI 1987/1755
Scalloway, Shetland, Pilotage Order 1987 SI 1987/1756
Guarantee Payments (Exemption) (No. 23) Order 1987 SI 1987/1757
Plant Health (Great Britain) Order 1987 SI 1987/1758
Housing and Planning Act 1986 (CommencementNo. 8) Order 1987 SI 1987/1759
Town and Country Planning (Structure and Local Plans) (Amendment) Regulations 1987 SI 1987/1760
Fire Safety and Safety of Places of Sport Act 1987 (Commencement No. 1) Order 1987 SI 1987/1762
Central Regional Council (Allt Chreagain, Strathyre) Water Order 1987 SI 1987/1763
Central Regional Council (Strathyre Borehole, Strathyre) Water Order 1987 SI 1987/1764
Personal Pension Schemes (Provisional Approval) Regulations 1987 SI 1987/1765
Agricultural or Forestry Tractors and Tractor Components (Type Approval) (Amendment) Regulations 1987 SI 1987/1771
 The South Somerset District (Parishes) Order 1987 S.I. 1987/1780
Customs Duties (Temporary Importation) (Revocation) Regulations 1987 SI 1987/1781
Control of Pollution (Exemption of Certain Discharges from Control) (Variation) Order 1987 SI 1987/1782
Olive Oil (Marketing Standards) Regulations 1987 SI 1987/1783
London—Fishguard Trunk Road (Flether Hill—Southleys Improvement) Order 1987 SI 1987/1784
Import Duty Reliefs (Revocation) Order 1987 SI 1987/1785
Petty Sessional Divisions (Kirklees) Order 1987 SI 1987/1786
Manchester Ship Canal Revision Order 1987 SI 1987/1790
Petty Sessional Divisions (Cornwall) Order 1987 SI 1987/1796
Petty Sessional Divisions (Nottinghamshire) Order 1987 SI 1987/1797
Bath-Lincoln Trunk Road A46 (Upper Swainswick to A420 Cold Ashton Roundabout) Order 1987 SI 1987/1799
Bath—Lincoln Trunk Road A46 (Upper Swainswick to A420 Cold Ashton Roundabout) (Detrunking) Order 1987 SI 1987/1800

1801–1900
Education (Grants for Further Training of Teachers and Educational Psychologists) (Scotland) Amendment Regulations 1987 SI 1987/1801
Food Protection (Emergency Prohibitions) (Wales) (No. 4) Amendment No. 2 Order 1987 SI 1987/1802
Food Protection (Emergency Prohibitions) (England) (No.2) Amendment No.6 Order 1987 SI 1987/1803
Customs Duties (ECSC) (No.2) (Amendment No.10) Order 1987 SI 1987/1804
Housing Benefits (Subsidy) Order 1987 SI 1987/1805
Value Added Tax (Tour Operators) Order 1987 SI 1987/1806
Industry Act 1972 (Amendment) Regulations 1987 SI 1987/1807
Export of Sheep (Prohibition) (No. 2) Order 1987 SI 1987/1808
Home Purchase Assistance (Recognised Lending Institutions) (No. 2) Order 1987 SI 1987/1809
Housing (Right to Buy) (Priority of Charges) (No. 2) Order 1987 SI 1987/1810
Mortgage Indemnities (Recognised Bodies) (No.2) Order 1987 SI 1987/1811
Rules of the Air and Air Traffic Control (Fourth Amendment) Regulations 1987 SI 1987/1812
Exempt Charities Order 1987 SI 1987/1823
Architects' Qualifications (EEC Recognition) Order 1987 SI 1987/1824
Child Abduction and Custody (Parties to Conventions) (Amendment) (No. 2) Order 1987 SI 1987/1825
Copyright (Taiwan) (Extension to Territories) Order 1987 SI 1987/1826
Merchant Shipping (Confirmation of Legislation) (Falkland Islands) Order 1987 SI 1987/1827
Repatriation of Prisoners (Overseas Territories) (Amendment) Order 1987 SI 1987/1828
Turks and Caicos Islands (Constitution) (Interim Amendment) (No. 3) Order 1987 SI 1987/1829
Social Security (Austria) Order 1987 SI 1987/1830
Social Security (Portugal) Order 1987 SI 1987/1831
AIDS (Control) (Northern Ireland) Order 1987 SI 1987/1832
Copyright (Taiwan Order) (Isle of Man Extension) Order 1987 SI 1987/1833
Fuel and Electricity (Control) Act 1973 (Continuation) (Jersey) Order 1987 SI 1987/1834
Hovercraft (Civil Liability) (Amendment) Order 1987 SI 1987/1835
Ministerial and other Salaries Order 1987 SI 1987/1836
Food Protection (Emergency Prohibitions) (No.3) Order 1987 Approved by both Houses of Parliament SI 1987/1837
Debtors (Scotland) Act 1987 (Commencement No.1) Order 1987 SI 1987/1838
Anglian Water Authority (Tunstead) Order 1987 SI 1987/1839
Acquisition of Land (Rate of Interest after Entry) (No. 3) Regulations 1987 SI 1987/1841
Acquisition of Land (Rate of Interest after Entry) (Scotland) (No. 3) Regulations 1987 SI 1987/1842
Common Agricultural Policy (Wine) Regulations 1987 SI 1987/1843
Building Societies (Provision of Services) (No. 2) Order 1987 SI 1987/1848
Town and Country Planning (Simplified Planning Zones) (Excluded Development) Order 1987 SI 1987/1849
Local Government Superannuation (Scotland) Regulations 1987 SI 1987/1850
Crown Prosecution Service (Witnesses' Allowances) (Amendment No. 6) Regulations 1987 SI 1987/1851
Wages Councils (Notices) (No. 2) Regulations 1987 SI 1987/1852
Social Security Act 1986 (Commencement No. 8) Order 1987 SI 1987/1853
Social Security (Widow's Benefit and Retirement Pensions) Amendment Regulations 1987 SI 1987/1854
Combined Probation Areas (Lancashire) Order 1987 SI 1987/1855
London-Brighton Trunk Road (A23 Albourne (B2116) — Muddleswood) Order 1987 SI 1987/1861
London-Brighton Trunk Road (A23 Muddleswood Slip Roads) Order 1987 SI 1987/1862
London-Brighton Trunk Road (Sayers Common-Muddleswood De-Trunking) Order 1987 SI 1987/1863
A423 West of Maidenhead—Oxford Trunk Road (Maidenhead Thicket—Burchetts Green Section) and Slip Roads Order 1987 SI 1987/1864
A423 West of Maidenhead—Oxford Trunk Road (Maidenhead Thicket—Burchetts Green Section) Detrunking Order 1987 SI 1987/1865
A404 Burchetts Green to M40 (Trunking and Slip Roads) Order 1987 SI 1987/1866
A423(M) Motorway (Maidenhead Thicket Section) and Connecting Roads Scheme 1987 SI 1987/1867
A423 West of Maidenhead—Oxford Trunk Road (Burchetts Green to A4142 Heyford Hill Roundabout) Detrunking Order 1987 SI 1987/1868
Building Societies (Designation of Pension Companies) Order 1987 SI 1987/1871
Building Societies (Jersey) Order 1987 SI 1987/1872
Police Cadets (Scotland) Amendment (No.2) Regulations 1987 SI 1987/1878
Highland Regional Council (Loch a'Choire Leith) Water Order 1987 SI 1987/1879
 The Epping Forest District (Parishes) Order 1987 S.I. 1987/1883
Air Navigation (Restriction of Flying) (Molesworth Aerodrome) Regulations 1987 SI 1987/1885
Merchant Shipping (Passenger Ship Construction) (Amendment) Regulations 1987 SI 1987/1886
General Optical Council (Registration and Enrolment (Amendment) Rules) Order of Council 1987 SI 1987/1887
Food Protection (Emergency Prohibitions) (No.4) Order 1987 Approved by both Houses of Parliament SI 1987/1888
Public Trustee (Custodian Trustee) Rules 1987 SI 1987/1891
Hallmarking (International Convention) (Amendment) Order 1987 SI 1987/1892
Food Protection (Emergency Prohibitions) (England) Order 1987 SI 1987/1893
Food Protection (Emergency Prohibitions) (Wales)(No. 5) Order 1987 SI 1987/1894
Income Tax (Cash Equivalents of Car Benefits) Order 1987 SI 1987/1897

1901–2000
Saithe (Specified Sea Areas) (Prohibition of Fishing) (Revocation) Order 1987 SI 1987/1900
Customs Duties (ECSC) (No.2) (Amendment No.11) Order 1987 SI 1987/1902
Data Protection (Subject Access Modification) (Health) Order 1987 SI 1987/1903
Data Protection (Subject Access Modification) (Social Work) Order 1987 SI 1987/1904
Data Protection (Regulation of Financial Services etc.) (Subject Access Exemption) Order 1987 SI 1987/1905
Data Protection (Miscellaneous Subject Access Exemptions) Order 1987 SI 1987/1906
Police Pensions (War Service) (Transferees) (Amendment) Regulations 1987 SI 1987/1907
Public Lending Right Scheme 1982 (Amendment) Order 1987 SI 1987/1908
Irish Sailors and Soldiers Land Trust Act 1987 (Commencement) Order 1987 SI 1987/1909
Housing Benefit (Implementation Subsidy) Order 1987 SI 1987/1910
Approval of Safety Standards Regulations 1987 SI 1987/1911
Petty Sessional Divisions (Gloucestershire) Order 1987 SI 1987/1912
Petty Sessional Divisions (Hereford and Worcester) Order 1987 SI 1987/1913
Police (Scotland) Amendment (No.2) Regulations 1987 SI 1987/1914
Opencast Coal (Compulsory Rights and Rights of Way) (Forms) Regulations 1987 SI 1987/1915
Value Added Tax (General) (Amendment) (No. 3) Regulations 1987 SI 1987/1916
Insolvency (Amendment) Rules 1987 SI 1987/1919
Cosmetic Products (Safety) (Amendment) Regulations 1987 SI 1987/1920
Insolvency (Scotland) Amendment Rules 1987 SI 1987/1921
Petty Sessional Divisions (Cumbria) Order 1987 SI 1987/1925
Severn-Trent Water Authority (Reconstitution of the Corporation of the Level of Hatfield Chase) Order 1987 SI 1987/1928
Severn-Trent Water Authority (Reconstitution of the Rivers Idle and Ryton Internal Drainage Board) Order 1987 SI 1987/1929
A41 London—Birmingham Trunk Road (North Street to Graven Hill, Bicester) (Detrunking) Order 1987 SI 1987/1930
A41 London—Birmingham Trunk Road (Bicester Bypass) Order 1987 SI 1987/1931
London—Fishguard Trunk Road (Nant-Y-Caws—Coed—Hirion By-pass) Order 1987 SI 1987/1932
Personal Pension Schemes (Deferment of Commencement) Regulations 1987 SI 1987/1933
Town and Country Planning (British Coal Corporation) (Amendment) Regulations 1987 SI 1987/1936
Town and Country Planning (British Coal Corporation) (Scotland) Amendment Regulations 1987 SI 1987/1937
Housing and Planning Act 1986 (Commencement No. 9) Order 1987 SI 1987/1939
Housing Association Shared Ownership Leases (Exclusion from Leasehold Reform Act 1967 and Rent Act 1977) Regulations 1987 SI 1987/1940
Safety of Sports Grounds Regulations 1987 SI 1987/1941
Building Societies (Business Premises) Order 1987 SI 1987/1942
Kyle and Carrick District and Cumnock and Doon Valley District (Loch Doon and Craigengillan Estate, Dalmellington) Boundaries Amendment Order 1987 SI 1987/1943 (S. 134)
Armed Forces Museums (Designation of Institutions) Order 1987 SI 1987/1945
Farm Business Specification Order 1987 SI 1987/1948
Farm Diversification Grant Scheme 1987 SI 1987/1949
Agriculture Improvement (Amendment) Regulations 1987 SI 1987/1950
Bedfordshire County Council (Leighton-Linslade Southern Bypass Yttingaford Bridge) Number Two Scheme 1985 Confirmation Instrument 1987 SI 1987/1954
Slaughterhouse Hygiene (Scotland) Amendment Regulations 1987 SI 1987/1957
Insolvency (Amendment) Regulations 1987 SI 1987/1959
Education Support Grants (Amendment) Regulations 1987 SI 1987/1960
Merchant Shipping (Pilot Ladders and Hoists) Regulations 1987 SI 1987/1961
Petty Sessional Divisions (Northumberland) Order 1987 SI 1987/1962
General Betting Duty Regulations 1987 SI 1987/1963
Industrial Training Levy (Road Transport) Order 1987 SI 1987/1964
National Health Service (General Dental Services) Amendment (No. 3) Regulations 1987 SI 1987/1965
 The East Northamptonshire (Parishes) Order 1987 S.I. 1987/1966
Income Support (General) Regulations 1987 SI 1987/1967
Social Security (Claims and Payments) Regulations 1987 SI 1987/1968
Income Support (Transitional) Regulations 1987 SI 1987/1969
Social Security (Adjudication) Amendment (No. 2) Regulations 1987 SI 1987/1970
Housing Benefit (General) Regulations 1987 SI 1987/1971
Housing Benefit (Transitional) Regulations 1987 SI 1987/1972
Family Credit (General) Regulations 1987 SI 1987/1973
Family Credit (Transitional) Regulations 1987 SI 1987/1974
Building Societies (Limited Credit Facilities) Order 1987 SI 1987/1975
Building Societies (Provision of Services) (No. 3) Order 1987 SI 1987/1976
Criminal Appeal (Amendment) Rules 1987 SI 1987/1977
Social Security Benefits Up-rating (No.2) Order 1987 SI 1987/1978
Asbestos Products (Safety) (Amendment) Regulations 1987 SI 1987/1979
Medicines (Exemptions from Restrictions on the Retail Sale or Supply of Veterinary Drugs) (Amendment) (No.2) Order 1987 SI 1987/1980
Occupational Pensions (Revaluation) Order 1987 SI 1987/1981
London City Airport Licensing (Liquor) Order 1987 SI 1987/1982
London City Airport Shops Order 1987 SI 1987/1983
South Tynedale Railway (Light Railway) Order 1987 SI 1987/1984
Colouring Matter in Food (Scotland) Amendment Regulations 1987 SI 1987/1985
Coffee and Coffee Products (Amendment) Regulations 1987 SI 1987/1986
Colouring Matter in Food (Amendment) Regulations1987 SI 1987/1987
Income Tax (Interest on Unpaid Tax and Repayment Supplement) (No. 4) Order 1987 SI 1987/1988
Income Tax (Official Rate of Interest on Beneficial Loans) (No.4) Order 1987 SI 1987/1989
Stamp Duty Reserve Tax (Interest on Tax Repaid) (No. 4) Order 1987 SI 1987/1990
Companies (Mergers and Divisions) Regulations 1987 SI 1987/1991
Financial Services Act 1986 (Commencement) (No.6) Order 1987 SI 1987/1997
Armed Forces Act 1986 (Commencement No. 3) Order 1987 SI 1987/1998
Courts Martial and Standing Civilian Courts (Additional Powers on Trial of Civilians) (Amendment) Regulations 1987 SI 1987/1999
Rules of Procedure (Air Force) (Amendment) 1987 SI 1987/2000

2001–2100
Standing Civilian Courts (Amendment) Order 1987 SI 1987/2001
Town and Country Planning (Minerals) Act 1981 (Commencement No.4) (Scotland) Order 1987 SI 1987/2002
Local Government Act 1986 (Commencement) Order 1987 SI 1987/2003
Local Authorities (Publicity Account) (Exemption) Order 1987 SI 1987/2004
Building Societies (Mergers) Regulations 1987 SI 1987/2005
Cambridge Water (Hinxton Borehole) Order 1987 SI 1987/2006
Thames Water Authority (Gatehampton Farm Boreholes) Order 1987 SI 1987/2007
Thames Water Authority (Leckhampstead Borehole) Order 1987 SI 1987/2008
Methylated Spirits Regulations 1987 SI 1987/2009
Supplementary Benefit (Single Payments) Amendment (No. 2) Regulations 1987 SI 1987/2010
Plaice (Specified Sea Areas) (Prohibition of Fishing) Order 1987 SI 1987/2011
Goods Vehicles (Authorisation of International Journeys) (Fees) (Amendment) Regulations 1987 SI 1987/2012
Coffee and Coffee Products (Scotland) Amendment Regulations 1987 SI 1987/2014
Value Added Tax (Repayments to Third Country Traders) Regulations 1987 SI 1987/2015
Offshore Installations (Safety Zones) (No. 70) Order 1987 SI 1987/2016
Offshore Installations (Safety Zones) (No. 71) Order 1987 SI 1987/2017
Building Societies (Designation of Qualifying Bodies) (Amendment) Order 1987 SI 1987/2018
Building Societies (Provision of Services) (No. 4) Order 1987 SI 1987/2019
Welfare of Battery Hens Regulations 1987 SI 1987/2020
Welfare of Calves Regulations 1987 SI 1987/2021
Water Authorities (Return on Assets) Order 1987 SI 1987/2022
Insolvent Companies (Disqualification of Unfit Directors) Proceedings Rules 1987 SI 1987/2023
Non-Contentious Probate Rules 1987 SI 1987/2024
Criminal Justice (Scotland) Act 1987 Fixed Penalty Order 1987 SI 1987/2025
Environmentally Sensitive Areas (Cambrian Mountains — Extension) Designation Order 1987 SI 1987/2026
Environmentally Sensitive Areas (Lleyn Peninsula) Designation Order 1987 SI 1987/2027
Data Protection (Functions of Designated Authority) Order 1987 SI 1987/2028
Environmentally Sensitive Areas (Breckland) Designation Order 1987 SI 1987/2029
Environmentally Sensitive Areas (North Peak) Designation Order 1987 SI 1987/2030
Environmentally Sensitive Areas (Shropshire Borders) Designation Order 1987 SI 1987/2031
Environmentally Sensitive Areas (South Downs—Western Extension) Designation Order 1987 SI 1987/2032
Environmentally Sensitive Areas (Suffolk River Valleys) Designation Order 1987 SI 1987/2033
Environmentally Sensitive Areas (Test Valley) Designation Order 1987 SI 1987/2034
Financial Services Act 1986 (Delegation) (Transitional Provisions) Order 1987 SI 1987/2035
Leicester-Great Yarmouth Trunk Road (A47) (Guyhirn Diversion) Order 1987 SI 1987/2036
Leicester—Great Yarmouth Trunk Road (A47) (Detrunking At Guyhirn) Order 1987 SI 1987/2037
Leicester–Great Yarmouth Trunk Road (A47) (Guyhirn Diversion) (River Nene Bridge) Order 1987 SI 1987/2038
Transfer of Functions (Minister for the Civil Service and Treasury) Order 1987 SI 1987/2039
European Communities (Definition of Treaties) (International Convention on the Harmonised Commodity Description and Coding System) Order 1987 SI 1987/2040
Extradition (Hijacking) (Amendment) Order 1987 SI 1987/2041
Extradition (Internationally Protected Persons) (Amendment) Order 1987 SI 1987/2042
Extradition (Protection of Aircraft) (Amendment) Order 1987 SI 1987/2043
Extradition (Taking of Hostages) (Amendment) Order 1987 SI 1987/2044
Suppression of Terrorism Act 1978 (Hong Kong) Order 1987 SI 1987/2045
United States of America (Extradition) (Amendment) Order 1987 SI 1987/2046
Irish Republic (Termination of 1927 Agreement) Order 1987 SI 1987/2047
Charities (Northern Ireland) Order 1987 SI 1987/2048
Consumer Protection(Northern Ireland) Order 1987 SI 1987/2049
Parliamentary Constituencies (Wales) (Miscellaneous Changes) Order 1987 SI 1987/2050
United Reformed Church Act 1981 (Guernsey) Order 1987 SI 1987/2051
Water (Fluoridation) (Northern Ireland) Order 1987 SI 1987/2052
Double Taxation Relief (Taxes on Income) (Belgium) Order 1987 SI 1987/2053
Double Taxation Relief (Taxes on Income) (Bulgaria) Order 1987 SI 1987/2054
Double Taxation Relief (Taxes on Income) (France) (No. 2) Order 1987 SI 1987/2055
Double Taxation Relief (Taxes on Income) (Malaysia) Order 1987 SI 1987/2056
Double Taxation Relief (Taxes on Income) (Nigeria) Order 1987 SI 1987/2057
Double Taxation Relief (Taxes on Income) (Pakistan) Order 1987 SI 1987/2058
Maximum Number of Judges Order 1987 SI 1987/2059
Copyright (International Conventions) (Amendment) Order 1987 SI 1987/2060
Uniform Laws on International Sales Order 1987 SI 1987/2061
Air Navigation (Second Amendment) Order 1987 SI 1987/2062
Channel Tunnel Act (Competition) Order 1987 SI 1987/2068
Financial Services Act 1986 (Transfer of Functions Relating to Friendly Societies) (Transitional Provisions) Order 1987 SI 1987/2069
Export of Goods (Control) Order 1987 SI 1987/2070
Double Taxation Relief (Taxes on Income) (Canadian Dividends and Interest) (Amendment) Regulations 1987 SI 1987/2071
Building Societies (Accounts and Related Provisions) Regulations 1987 SI 1987/2072
Sunderland and South Shields Water Order 1987 SI 1987/2073
Queensferry — South of Birkenhead Trunk Road (A550 — Ledsham Station Diversion) Order 1987 SI 1987/2074
Income Tax (Reduced and Composite Rate) Order 1987 SI 1987/2075
Education (Publication and Consultation Etc.) (Scotland) Amendment Regulations 1987 SI 1987/2076
Tayside and Fife Regions and Perth and Kinross and North East Fife Districts (Auchtermuchty) Boundaries Amendment Order 1987 SI 1987/2077 (S. 141)
Air Navigation (General) (Second Amendment) Regulations 1987 SI 1987/2078
Civil Aviation (Route Charges for Navigation Services) (Fourth Amendment) Regulations 1987 SI 1987/2083
County Council of Humberside (Stoneferry Bridge, Kingston Upon Hull) Scheme 1987 Confirmation Instrument 1987 SI 1987/2084
Road Vehicles (Prescribed Regulations for the Purposes of Increased Penalties) Regulations 1987 SI 1987/2085
Road Vehicles (Prescribed Regulations for the Purposes of Increased Penalties) Regulations (Northern Ireland) 1987 SI 1987/2086
Registration of Births and Deaths Regulations 1987 SI 1987/2088
Registration of Births and Deaths (Welsh Language) Regulations 1987 SI 1987/2089
Local Statutory Provisions (Postponement of Repeal) (Scotland) Order 1987 SI 1987/2090
Immigration (Control of Entry through Republic of Ireland) (Amendment) Order 1987 SI 1987/2092
Insolvency (ECSC Levy Debts) Regulations 1987 SI 1987/2093
Public Telecommunication System Designation (Kingston upon Hull City Council and Kingston Communications (Hull) PLC) Order 1987 SI 1987/2094
Newlyn Pier and Harbour Revision Order 1987 SI 1987/2095
National Savings Bank (Interest on Ordinary Deposits) Order 1987 SI 1987/2096
Counterfeit Goods (Customs) Regulations 1987 SI 1987/2097
Legal Aid Act 1974 (Deduction from Taxed Costs) Regulations 1987 SI 1987/2098
Medicines (Pharmacies) (Applications for Registration and Fees) Amendment Regulations 1987 SI 1987/2099
Civil Aviation (Joint Financing) (Fifth Amendment) Regulations 1987 SI 1987/2100

2101–2200
Bath to West of Southampton Trunk Road A36 (Beckington Bypass) Order 1987 SI 1987/2101
Bath to West of Southampton Trunk Road A36 (Beckington Bypass) (Detrunking) Order 1987 SI 1987/2102
Customs and Excise (Community Transit) (No. 2) Regulations 1987 SI 1987/2105
Customs Duties (Repeals) (Revocation of Savings) Order 1987 SI 1987/2106
Origin of Goods (Petroleum Products) Regulations 1987 SI 1987/2107
Value Added Tax (Imported Goods) Relief (Amendment) (No. 2) Order 1987 SI 1987/2108
Local Government Reorganisation (Pensions etc.) (South Yorkshire) Order 1987 SI 1987/2110
Social Security (Contributions) Amendment (No.4) Regulations 1987 SI 1987/2111
Social Security (Industrial Injuries)(Prescribed Diseases) Amendment (No.2) Regulations 1987 SI 1987/2112
Merchant Shipping (Fees) (Amendment) (No. 3) Regulations 1987 SI 1987/2113
Northern Ireland (Prescribed Area) Regulations 1987 SI 1987/2114
Control of Asbestos at Work Regulations 1987 SI 1987/2115
Benzene in Toys (Safety) Regulations 1987 SI 1987/2116
Consumer Protection (Cancellation of Contracts Concluded away from Business Premises) Regulations 1987 SI 1987/2117
Insurance Companies (Mergers and Divisions) Regulations 1987 SI 1987/2118
Criminal Justice (Scotland) Act 1987 (Commencement No.3) Order 1987 SI 1987/2119
Recovery Vehicles (Prescribed Purposes) Regulations 1987 SI 1987/2120
Recovery Vehicles (Prescribed Purposes) Regulations (Northern Ireland) 1987 SI 1987/2121
Road Vehicles (Excise) (Prescribed Particulars) (Amendment) Regulations 1987 SI 1987/2122
Road Vehicles (Registration and Licensing) (Amendment) Regulations 1987 SI 1987/2123
Road Vehicles (Registration and Licensing) (Amendment) Regulations (Northern Ireland) 1987 SI 1987/2124
Customs Duties (ECSC) (Quota and Other Reliefs) Order 1987 SI 1987/2126
Income Tax (Interest Relief) (Qualifying Lenders) (No. 2) Order 1987 SI 1987/2127
Personal Equity Plan (Amendment) Regulations 1987 SI 1987/2128
Hill Livestock (Compensatory Allowances) (Amendment) Regulations 1987 SI 1987/2129
Insurance Companies (Assistance) Regulations 1987 SI 1987/2130
Building Societies (Limit on Non-Retail Funds and Deposits) Order 1987 SI 1987/2131
Friendly Societies (Long Term Insurance Business) Regulations 1987 SI 1987/2132
Building Societies (Aggregation) Rules 1987 SI 1987/2133
A10 Trunk Road (Great Cambridge Road, Enfield) (Prohibition of Cycling and of Horse Riding in Subways) Order 1987 SI 1987/2134
Combined Probation Areas (Dorset) Order 1987 SI 1987/2135
Combined Probation Areas (Nottinghamshire) Order 1987 SI 1987/2136
Suppression of Terrorism Act 1978 (Designation of Countries) Order 1987 SI 1987/2137
Pilotage Act 1987 (Commencement No. 2) Order 1987 SI 1987/2138
Pilotage Act 1987 (Pilots' National Pension Fund) Order 1987 SI 1987/2139
Combined Probation Areas (Cornwall) Order 1987 SI 1987/2140
Combined Probation Areas (West Yorkshire) Order 1987 SI 1987/2141
Financial Services Act 1986 (Overseas Investment Exchanges and Overseas Clearing Houses) (Notification) Regulations 1987 SI 1987/2142
Financial Services Act 1986 (Overseas Investment Exchanges and Overseas Clearing Houses) (Periodical Fees) Regulations 1987 SI 1987/2143
County Council of Hampshire (M275 Rudmore Flyover Portsmouth) Motorway Scheme 1987 Confirmation Instrument 1987 SI 1987/2147
(A19) East of Snaith-Sunderland Trunk Road (A19/A1290 Downhill Junction and Slip Roads) Order 1987 SI 1987/2148
Video Recordings Act 1984 (Commencement No. 6) Order 1987 SI 1987/2155
Nurses, Midwives and Health Visitors (Professional Conduct) Rules 1987 Approval Order 1987 SI 1987/2156
Financial Services Act 1986 (Applications for Authorisation) (Appointed Day) Order 1987 SI 1987/2157
Financial Services Act 1986 (Commencement) (No. 7) Order 1987 SI 1987/2158
Smoke Control Areas (Authorised Fuels) (No. 2) Regulations 1987 SI 1987/2159
Act of Sederunt (Rules of Court Amendment No.5) (Miscellaneous) 1987 SI 1987/2160
Motor Vehicles (Authorisation of Special Types) (Amendment) (No. 2) Order 1987 SI 1987/2161
 The Kirklees (Parish of Mirfield) Order 1987 S.I. 1987/2164
 The Mid Sussex (Parishes) (No. 2) Order 1987 S.I. 1987/2165
General Medical Council (Registration (Fees) (Amendment) Regulations) (No. 2) Order of Council 1987 SI 1987/2166
Non-Domestic Rates and Community Charges (Timetable) (Scotland) Regulations 1987 SI 1987/2167
Islington (Prescribed Routes) (No. 4) Traffic Order 1985 (Variation) Order 1987 SI 1987/2168
Goods Vehicles (Operators' Licences, Qualifications and Fees) (Amendment) (No. 2) Regulations 1987 SI 1987/2170
Motor Vehicles (Compulsory Insurance) Regulations 1987 SI 1987/2171
Rules of Procedure (Air Force) (Amendment No.2) Rules 1987 SI 1987/2172
Standing Civilian Courts (Amendment No. 2) Order 1987 SI 1987/2173
General Medical Council Health Committee (Procedure) Rules Order of Council 1987 SI 1987/2174
Electricity Generating Stations (Fuel Control)Order 1987 SI 1987/2175
Prison (Amendment No. 2) Rules 1987 SI 1987/2176
Landlord and Tenant Act 1987 (Commencement No. 1) Order 1987 SI 1987/2177
Rent Assessment Committee (England and Wales) (Leasehold Valuation Tribunal) (Amendment) Regulations 1987 SI 1987/2178
Abolition of Domestic Rates (Domestic and Part Residential Subjects) (Scotland) Regulations 1987 SI 1987/2179
Combined Probation Areas (Gloucestershire) Order 1987 SI 1987/2181
Electricity Generating Stations and Overhead Lines (Inquiries Procedure) Rules 1987 SI 1987/2182
Customs Duties (Spain and Portugal) Order 1987 SI 1987/2183
Customs Duties (ECSC) Order 1987 SI 1987/2184
Homes Insulation Grants Order 1987 SI 1987/2185
Local Government (Prescribed Expenditure) (Consolidation and Amendment) Regulations 1987 SI 1987/2186
National Metrological Co-ordinating Unit (Transfer of Functions and Abolition) Order 1987 SI 1987/2187
Kirkcaldy and North East Fife Districts (Montrave Estate) Boundaries Amendment Order 1987 SI 1987/2188 (S. 147)
Cod (Specified Sea Areas) (Prohibition of Fishing) Order 1987 SI 1987/2192
Supplementary Benefit (Requirements) Amendment Regulations 1987 SI 1987/2193
Fishguard-Bangor (Menai Suspension Bridge) Trunk Road (Cardigan By-pass) Order 1987 SI 1987/2194
Coypus (Prohibition on Keeping) Order 1987 SI 1987/2195
Mink (Keeping) Order 1987 SI 1987/2196
Civil Jurisdiction (Offshore Activities) Order 1987 SI 1987/2197
Criminal Jurisdiction (Offshore Activities) Order 1987 SI 1987/2198
Cayman Islands (Constitution) (Amendment) Order 1987 SI 1987/2199
Copyright (Computer Software) (Extension to Territories) Order 1987 SI 1987/2200

2201–2300
Foreign Compensation (People's Republic of China) Order 1987 SI 1987/2201
Pharmaceutical Qualifications (EEC Recognition) Order 1987 SI 1987/2202
Adoption (Northern Ireland) Order 1987 SI 1987/2203
Appropriation (No. 3) (Northern Ireland) Order 1987 SI 1987/2204
Broadcasting Act 1981 (Channel Islands) Order 1987 SI 1987/2205
Extradition (Suppression of Terrorism) (Amendment) Order 1987 SI 1987/2206
Nuclear Installations (Jersey) (Variation) Order 1987 SI 1987/2207
Parliamentary Constituencies (England) (Miscellaneous Changes) (No. 3) Order 1987 SI 1987/2208
Parliamentary Constituencies (England) (Miscellaneous Changes) (No.4) Order 1987 SI 1987/2209
Plant Varieties and Seeds (Isle of Man) Order 1987 SI 1987/2210
Reciprocal Enforcement of Foreign Judgments (Canada) (Amendment) Order 1987 SI 1987/2211
Air Navigation (Noise Certification) Order 1987 SI 1987/2212
Land Registration (District Registries) (No.2) Order 1987 SI 1987/2213
Land Registration Rules 1987 SI 1987/2214
Police Pensions (Purchase of Increased Benefits) Regulations 1987 SI 1987/2215
Medicines (Carbadox Prohibition) (Revocation) Order 1987 SI 1987/2216
Medicines (Exemptions from Licences) (Carbadox and Olaquindox) Order 1987 SI 1987/2217
National Health Service (Superannuation) Amendment Regulations 1987 SI 1987/2218
London Government Reorganisation (Housing Association Mortgages) (No. 2) Order 1987 SI 1987/2219
Combined Probation Areas (Cumbria) Order 1987 SI 1987/2222
Combined Probation Areas (Hereford and Worcester) Order 1987 SI 1987/2223
Coypus (Keeping) (Revocation) Regulations 1987 SI 1987/2224
Mink (Keeping) (Amendment) Regulations 1987 SI 1987/2225
Police (Discipline) (Scotland) Amendment Regulations 1987 SI 1987/2226
Town and Country Planning (Control of Advertisements) (Amendment No. 2) Regulations 1987 SI 1987/2227
Dorset (District Boundaries) Order 1987 SI 1987/2228
Aerodromes (Designation) (Detention and Sale of Aircraft) (No.2) Order 1987 SI 1987/2229
Severn—Trent Water Authority (Abolition of the Elford Internal Drainage District) Order 1987 SI 1987/2230
Prison (Scotland) Amendment Rules 1987 SI 1987/2231
Airports Act 1986 (Government Shareholding) Order 1987 SI 1987/2232
Social Work (Residential Establishments-Child Care) (Scotland) Regulations 1987 SI 1987/2233
Sea Fishing (Enforcement of Community Quota Measures) Order 1987 SI 1987/2234
Slaughterhouses (Hygiene) (Amendment) Regulations 1987 SI 1987/2235
Meat Inspection Regulations 1987 SI 1987/2236
Fresh Meat Export (Hygiene and Inspection) Regulations 1987 SI 1987/2237
Merchant Shipping (Passenger Ship Construction) (Amendment No. 2) Regulations 1987 SI 1987/2238
Buckinghamshire County Council H8 Standing Way (Canal Bridge) Scheme 1987 Confirmation Instrument 1987 SI 1987/2241
Secretary of State's Traffic Orders (Procedure) (Scotland) Regulations 1987 SI 1987/2244
Local Roads Authorities' Traffic Orders (Procedure) (Scotland) Regulations 1987 SI 1987/2245
Airports Byelaws (Designation) (No. 2) Order 1987 SI 1987/2246
Leicestershire (District Boundaries) Order 1987 SI 1987/2247
Diplomatic and Consular Premises Act 1987 (Commencement No. 2) Order 1987 SI 1987/2248
Public Trustee (Amendment) Rules 1987 SI 1987/2249
M1 Motorway (Catthorpe Interchange) Connecting Roads Scheme 1987 SI 1987/2253
M6 Motorway (Catthorpe Interchange) Connecting Roads Scheme 1987 SI 1987/2254
A604 Catthorpe—Harwich Trunk Road (Catthorpe to Rothwell Section and Slip Roads) Order 1987 SI 1987/2256
A6 London—Inverness Trunk Road (Rothwell Interchange) Order 1987 SI 1987/2257
 The Cannock Chase (Parishes) Order 1987 S.I. 1987/2259
Bath — Lincoln Trunk Road (Alcester Bypasses A435/A422) Order 1987 SI 1987/2261
Bath-Lincoln Trunk Road (A439) (Norton to Stratford-upon-Avon) De-Trunking Order 1987 SI 1987/2262
Worcester — Banbury Principal Road (A422) (South and East of Alcester) Trunking Order 1987 SI 1987/2263
Evesham — Birmingham Principal Road (A435) (Alcester to Portway) Trunking Order 1987 SI 1987/2264
Evesham-Birmingham Principal Road (A435) (Norton to Arrow) Trunking Order 1987 SI 1987/2265
Faculty Jurisdiction (Amendment) Rules 1987 SI 1987/2266
Folkestone—Honiton Trunk Road A35 (Axminster Bypass and Slip Road) Order 1987 SI 1987/2267
Folkestone—Honiton Trunk Road A35 (Axminster Bypass and Slip Road) (Detrunking) Order 1987 SI 1987/2268
Housing (Improvement and Repairs Grants) (Approved Expenses Maxima) (Scotland) Order 1987 SI 1987/2269
Severn-Trent Water Authority (Shelton Borehole) Order 1987 SI 1987/2271
Oil and Gas (Enterprise) Act 1982 (Commencement No. 4) Order 1987 SI 1987/2272
Video Recordings Act 1984 (Scotland) (Commencement No.6) Order 1987 SI 1987/2273
(A64) Leeds—York—Scarborough Trunk Road (Copmanthorpe Grade Separated Junction) (Trunking) Order 1987 SI 1987/2274
Common Parts Grant (Eligible Expense Limits) Order 1987 SI 1987/2276
Housing and Planning Act 1986 (Commencement No. 10) Order 1987 SI 1987/2277
A470 Cardiff-Glan Conwy Trunk Road (Improvement between Pen-Isa'r-Waen and the Brecon By-pass) Order 1987 SI 1987/2278
Rate Support Grant (Scotland) (No.3) Order 1987 SI 1987/2279

See also
List of Statutory Instruments of the United Kingdom

References

External links
 Legislation.gov.uk, delivered by the UK National Archive
 UK SI's on legislation.gov.uk
 UK Draft SI's on legislation.gov.uk

Lists of Statutory Instruments of the United Kingdom
Statutory Instruments